Olympiacos B.C., commonly referred to as Olympiacos and Olympiacos Piraeus, is a Greek professional basketball club based in Piraeus, part of the major multi-sport club, Olympiacos CFP. The parent club was founded in 1925, with the basketball team created in 1931, and their home ground is the Peace and Friendship Stadium in Piraeus.

Olympiacos has been established as one of the most successful clubs in Greek basketball history and one of the most successful clubs in European basketball, having won three EuroLeagues, one FIBA Intercontinental Cup, one Triple Crown, thirteen Greek League titles and eleven Greek Cups. As a traditional European powerhouse, Olympiacos have also been five times EuroLeague runners-up and, having played a total of eight finals, they are the Greek club with the most EuroLeague Final appearances. They have also participated in eleven EuroLeague Final Fours.

The first major achievement of Olympiacos in European competitions was their presence in the 1978–79 FIBA European Champions Cup semi-finals group stage, but it was in the 1990s that Olympiacos made their biggest mark. They became the first ever Greek club that reached the EuroLeague Final, being runners-up in two consecutive seasons (1994 and 1995), winning their first EuroLeague title in 1997, after a convincing 73–58 win to Barcelona in Rome, which was a record margin win at the time for one-leg final in the competition's history. In the same season, they achieved the first Triple Crown for a Greek team and as European champions they played in the 1997 McDonald's Championship, where they met in the final the Michael Jordan's NBA champions, the Chicago Bulls. During the 1990s, besides their constant achievements in EuroLeague, also adding a third place in 1999, Olympiacos dominated the Greek Basket League with five consecutive titles, at a time when the Greek championship was considered Europe's best national basketball league. Thus, FIBA declared Olympiacos as the "Best European Team of the 1990s".

Olympiacos returned to the very top of European basketball in 2010, when they reached the final against Barcelona in Paris, but mostly in 2012, when they won their second EuroLeague title in Istanbul, by rallying from 19 points down in the championship game, to beat CSKA Moscow 62–61, on the last shot of the game, achieving the greatest comeback in European basketball finals history, and one of the greatest ever seen in European continental basketball. In 2013, Olympiacos won their third EuroLeague title and became the only Greek club and only the third club in European basketball history to be crowned back-to-back European champions in the modern EuroLeague Final Four era, after beating Real Madrid 100–88 in the London final. Later on, Olympiacos won the Intercontinental Cup, celebrating a third international title in 17 months.

Some of the greatest players in European basketball have played for Olympiacos over the years including: Charlie Yelverton, Carey Scurry, Žarko Paspalj, Giorgos Sigalas, Dragan Tarlać, Walter Berry, Panagiotis Fasoulas, Roy Tarpley, Eddie Johnson, Alexander Volkov, David Rivers, Chris Welp, Artūras Karnišovas, Arijan Komazec, Dino Rađja, Theo Papaloukas, Alphonso Ford, Tyus Edney, Arvydas Macijauskas, Ioannis Bourousis, Miloš Teodosić, Nikola Vujčić, Josh Childress, Linas Kleiza, Rašho Nesterović, Kostas Papanikolaou, Kostas Sloukas, Kyle Hines, Joey Dorsey, Stratos Perperoglou, Acie Law, Georgios Printezis and Vassilis Spanoulis. Under the ownership of billionaire Greek brothers Panagiotis Angelopoulos and Giorgos Angelopoulos, Olympiacos made a record transfer in 2008, by signing NBA player Josh Childress, whose US$20 million net income contract for three years made him the highest-paid basketball player in the world ever, outside the NBA.

History

1930s–1960s

The club had its beginnings in the 1930s. Olympiacos was the first Greek team to familiarize itself with American style basketball, as Alekos Spanoudakis learned to imitate the American style jump shot, and his brother, Ioannis Spanoudakis (who was both player and head coach of the team), met basketball legend Bob Cousy, and practiced many of his secrets and techniques on the court. The Spanoudakis brothers led the club to its first Greek League championship in 1949. The second title did not come until 11 years later, in 1960, and allowed the Reds for the first time to qualify for the European Champions Cup (now called EuroLeague) (1960–61 season), which was their first ever participation at the European-wide level.

1970s–1980s
It was not until 1976 that coach Faidon Matthaiou managed to create a strong team based on the stars Steve Giatzoglou, Giorgos Kastrinakis, Giorgos Barlas and on strong team players like Paul Melini and Pavlos Diakoulas. Olympiacos would win another Greek title and it did so in unprecedented fashion, running off 22 victories in 22 games. Reds completed the first double in their history, winning the Greek Cup, while they did very well in the Cup Winner's Cup as well, reaching the last 8. The next year, Kostas Mourouzis was appointed as head coach and the team won the Greek cup, after eliminating Panathinaikos with a record-setting 110–68 away win (42 points difference, the highest ever in the games between the two teams). Melini led Olympiacos with 24 points, while Kastrinakis scored 22. In 1978 the team did their second double in 3 years, winning both the Greek championship (losing only 1 game) and their third Greek cup in a row, beating AEK 103–88 in the final.

In 1979 the club also had their first significant success in Europe, reaching the final round (Final-6) of the European Championship. The final round of that year was one of the toughest ever in the competition. Olympiacos finished 6th, winning only one game, the 79–77 home victory against Maccabi Tel Aviv. In general, Olympiacos was a tough home team and although they lost all the rest of their home matches, the scores were really close: 84–95 to Joventut Freixenet (77–91 away), 68–72 to Emerson Varese (67–92 away), 97–101 to Real Madrid (72–113 away), 83–88 to Bosna (72–89 away). Olympiacos won another Greek Cup title in 1980 which was the last of the successful Giatzoglou–Kastrinakis era. In 1979, 1980 and 1981 Olympiacos finished at the second place of the Greek championship.

Although the 1970s was the most successful decade for the team up to that time, the 1980s marked a low period for the Reds, who did not manage to play a major domestic role, being outshined by the up-and-coming superpowers from Thessaloniki, Aris and PAOK. The team was led by Greek players such as Dimitris Maniatis and Argiris Kambouris, the hero of EuroBasket 1987, but their strong effort was not enough to bring any significant results. Well-known players such as Carey Scurry and Todd Mitchell couldn't lead the club to success.

1990s: FIBA's Best European Team of the 1990s

It was in the 1990s that the Reds made their biggest mark. The middle of that decade belonged to Olympiacos, not only in Greece, but also in Europe. In the 1991–92 season, record holding Greek basketball coach Giannis Ioannidis left Aris to manage Olympiacos, the torpid giant, and created a tough, team-oriented, offensive basketball team. In addition to this, Olympiacos left the old Papastrateio Indoor Hall, to move into Peace and Friendship Stadium (commonly called SEF), an indoor arena at that time of 17,000 seats and the biggest in Greece until the Olympic Indoor Hall was inaugurated in 1995. By that year the club had fully rebounded, climbing all the way back to rule Greece.

Five consecutive Greek Championships from 1993 to 1997 and two Greek Cups in 1994 and 1997, made the team the indubitable dominant club in Greece. During this period, Olympiacos was the best supported basketball team, not only in Greece but in Europe as well, as Peace and Friendship Stadium was full in most of their matches, making Olympiacos invincible in it. In addition to their domestic success, Olympiacos became the most successful team in the EuroLeague of that period, leading FIBA to select them as the Best European Team in the decade of the 1990s.

5 Greek championships in a row, twice EuroLeague runners-up

In the 1992–93 season, in their first year in the FIBA European League, after a hard run which started in Hala Tivoli against Smelt Olimpija (for the second preliminary round) and continued in the top 16 round where Olympiacos ranked third in a tough group and qualified for the quarterfinal play-offs, together with Real Madrid Teka of Arvydas Sabonis, Benetton Treviso of Toni Kukoč and Pau-Orthez of Gheorghe Mureșan. However they did not manage to qualify for the 1993 FIBA European League Final Four in Piraeus, Athens which was held at their home court, Peace and Friendship Stadium, as they were eliminated by Limoges CSP in the quarter-finals with 2–1 wins, after a breathtaking third game in Palais des Sports de Beaublanc (58–60), which was decided in the last seconds after an off-balance two-points shot by the Slovenian star Jure Zdovc. Domestically, despite finishing 4th in the Greek A1 regular season, Olympiacos eliminated in the quarter-finals with 2–0 wins the FIBA European Cup champions Sato Aris but at the same time lost to Aris (66–71) for the Greek Cup semi-final game in their homeseat and excluded from the 1993 Cup Final (the final was set by E.O.K. to take place in SEF). Finally Olympiacos won their first Greek Championship since 1978, defeating in the semi-finals with 3–1 wins a totally disappointed PAOK by the failure at the Final Four in Athens, and then Panathinaikos in the finals with 3–1 wins as well, even though both of Olympiacos' opponents had the home-court advantage.

The following year, Olympiacos had a top-class roster with players like Roy Tarpley, Žarko Paspalj, Dragan Tarlać, Panagiotis Fasoulas, Giorgos Sigalas, Milan Tomić, Franco Nakić and Efthimis Bakatsias, and reached the FIBA European League Final Four in Yad Eliyahu Arena, Tel Aviv for the first time in their history. After an impressive run in the top 16, achieving significant away wins for the first time in the European history of the club against Real Madrid Teka (58–57 in Palacio de Deportes) or against Benetton Treviso (79–73 in Palaverde) and a newfound home victory by 18 points difference against FC Barcelona Banca Catalana (82–64), the "Reds" qualified as group winners (11–3 record) for the quarter-final playoffs where they faced the ranked fourth of the group B, the Italian champions Buckler Beer Bologna of Yugoslav superstar Sasha Danilović and eliminated them hardly with 2–1 wins. In the Tel Aviv Final Four which was looked like an Athenaic-Catalan tournament demonstration, they faced their arch-rivals Panathinaikos in the semi-final (by the way the other semi-final was FC Barcelona Banca Catalana vs 7up Joventut), beating them 77–72 and becoming the first Greek team to ever play in the Euroleague Final. Paspalj scored 22 points and Tarpley recorded a double-double against Panathinaikos, scoring 21 points and grabbing no less than 16 rebounds for Olympiacos. The "Reds", despite being strong favourites to win the European crown, lost 57–59 to 7up Joventut in the final after a dramatic ending. Domestically, they had a very successful season, as they managed to celebrate the Double, winning an extremely competitive Greek Championship with 3–2 wins against PAOK Bravo of Bane Prelević, Walter Berry and Zoran Savić -who had been crowned FIBA Korać Cup champions two months earlier- and the Greek Cup as well, beating Stiebel Eltron Iraklis 63–51 in the final in SEF.

In the 1994–95 season, Olympiacos with the NBA veteran and 3-point specialist Eddie Johnson and the great Ukrainian combo-forward Sasha Volkov as additives in a very attached roster that was experienced from the participation in the next season Final Four of Tel Aviv, started the season as one of the favorites for participation in the Final Four and winning the European championship. In addition to domestic competitions Olympiacos had become regime and the goal was winning the double. The aim of the Greek Cup extinguished from the beginning after the defeat by Panathinaikos with the strangeness 40–42 in the knock-out match that held in the Sporting Indoor Hall because Olympiacos was punished for the events that take place in the fifth final of the last season play-offs against PAOK. In Europe the team launched their obligations with a resounding victory (77–42) at Abdi İpekçi Arena against Efes Pilsen, continued with some extended victories at home (101–69 against risky Cibona, 84–53 against the decadent European champions of 7up Joventut, 89–64 against Buckler Beer Bologna), achieved the classical double win against Bayer 04 Leverkusen of Dirk Bauermann, did the classical double defeat by the Limouzo of Božidar Maljković, crashed (99–78) FC Barcelona Banca Catalana in SEF and eventually qualified as second from the group B with the homecourt advantage in their pocket. Olympiacos eliminated CSKA Moscow with 2–1 wins in the quarter-final playoffs and reached their second FIBA European League Final Four in Pabellón Príncipe Felipe, Zaragoza, facing again their eternal enemies Panathinaikos in the semi-final. They defeated them one more time 58–52, with 27 points and 10 rebounds from club legend Eddie Johnson, including four decisive 3-pointers in the final minutes of the game, thus advancing to the EuroLeague Final for the second consecutive year. There, they played against another Spanish team, Real Madrid Teka, who were playing on their home soil and managed to defeat Olympiacos 61–73. Domestically, the Reds managed to win their third consecutive Greek Championship with 3–2 wins in the best-of-five finals against Panathinaikos, after a thrilling 45–44 home win against their arch-rivals in the decisive fifth and last match.

In the next season, 1995–96, although Olympiacos made an excellent course in the FIBA European League top 16 group stage and achieved a 10–4 record, he ranked third in the group because in the triple tie with CSKA Moscow and the FIBA European Cup champions of Benetton Treviso had the disadvantage with 1–3 wins. In the quarter-finals Olympiacos faced Real Madrid Teka with home-court disadvantage and did not manage to make the Final Four for a third season in a row, losing the play-off series with 1–2 wins (68–49 win in Piraeus, 77–80 and 65–80 losses in Madrid). However, the season ended in an extremely memorable way, because in the last game of the best-of-five series of the Greek League Finals, Olympiacos smashed arch-rivals and European champions Panathinaikos with a thrashing 73–38 victory, an all-time record victory margin (35 points) for the Greek League Finals and the second largest winning margin in an Olympiacos–Panathinaikos game after Olympiacos' 110–68 (42-point margin) record away win against Panathinaikos in the Greek Cup in 1977. Five players scored in double digits (Rivers 16 points, Tarlać 14, Nakić 12, Berry and Sigalas 10 each) and led Olympiacos to their fourth consecutive Greek Championship in front of their ecstatic fans, who celebrated the title and the historic win in a euphoric frenzy at Peace and Friendship Stadium.

European Champions and Triple Crown Glory

In the 1996–97 season, with a new coach, Dušan Ivković at the bench, the Reds and their fans had more hope than ever for the European title. In the regular season of the EuroLeague Olympiacos' performance was not as good as it was in the previous years, but in the play-offs they were impressive, twice breaking their opponents home court advantage. Their first victim was Partizan. In a strange best of three series, Olympiacos won the first match with 81–71 in Belgrade, lost the second at Peace and Friendship Stadium (61–60), which disappointed their fans, and finally won the third game in Belgrade with 74–69, which advanced them to the quarter-finals where the defending champions Panathinaikos were waiting for them with a home court advantage. Panathinaikos was ready to stop their rivals and take the revenge for the last year's smashing 73–38 defeat in the Greek finals. In the first game of the series at Panathinaikos' home, the Athens Olympic Indoor Hall, Olympiacos once again thrashed the Greens, beating them 69–49 in front of their own fans. After the 20-point difference triumph in their rivals' court, they were only one win away from the Final Four. In the second match, at Peace and Friendship Stadium, in front of 17,000 ecstatic Reds fans, Olympiacos beat Panathinaikos once more by a score of 65–57 and advanced to the Final Four in Rome.

Olympiacos were the unquestionable favorites to win the EuroLeague championship and they made it, after two dominating performances in the Final Four. They faced Smelt Olimpija in the semi-final and beat them 74–65, with David Rivers scoring 28 points. In the final, they played against FC Barcelona Banca Catalana, and after an impressive display, they won by a score of 73–58, and became European Champions for the first time in their history. Rivers led Olympiacos, scoring an average of 27 points in the two games, and was eventually voted Final Four MVP. The thousands of Olympiacos fans who filled Palaeur arena, were quick to sing that, "in Rome, in the final, we lifted the European title" (Greek: Στη Ρώμη και στον τελικό, σηκώσαμε Ευρωπαϊκό). This remains one of the club's most popular chants to this day. Olympiacos went on to complete the coveted Triple Crown in convincing fashion: they won the Greek League title (with 3–1 wins against the season's surprise team AEK) and the Greek Cup (beating Dexim Apollon Patras 80–78 in the final, in Olympic Indoor Hall), to mark the most successful season in the club's long history. Olympiacos became the first Greek team to ever win the Triple Crown, and remained the only to do so one up until 2007.

McDonald's Championship finalists against the Chicago Bulls
In October of the same year, the club played in the 1997 McDonald's Championship, in Paris. Having defeated Atenas in the semi-final by 89–86, Olympiacos played against the NBA champions Chicago Bulls in the final. The game was played under zone-friendly European rules (the games between NBA and FIBA teams were played under a mixture of NBA and FIBA rules at that time), but, out of respect for the Bulls, Olympiacos never used a zone defense. Olympiacos was defeated 78–104, by the Bulls, and one of the greatest basketball players ever, Michael Jordan.

In the 1997–98 season, Olympiacos were once again the favorites in all the competitions they were taking part. They started the season with an impressive record of consecutive wins in Greece and Europe. But in the second half of the season, things went wrong for the team. Olympiacos played in the round of 16 of the EuroLeague, with a home court advantage against Partizan in a three-game series, but they lost both matches in Athens and Belgrade and the European Champions suffered an early and disappointing elimination. In the Greek Cup's Final Four, they faced Panathinaikos for the 3rd place and they won easily.

In the Greek League, Olympiacos finished the regular season in second place, behind Panathinaikos. In the semi-finals, Olympiacos faced PAOK, having a home court advantage in a best of three series. In the first match in Athens, Olympiacos took a tight 66–65 win and held the advantage. They lost the second match in Thessaloniki, and the last game was held again in Athens. Olympiacos lost 58–55 in Neo Faliro, marking the first ever defeat for the team in Peace and Friendship Stadium during the Greek playoffs. The Reds did not have the chance to defend their crown and they ended up in third place, with a 3–1 series win over AEK.

The 1998–99 season did not begin well, because in the season's opening match of the Greek Cup, Olympiacos was eliminated by PAOK. The Reds played once again in the EuroLeague Final Four, and although they were considered the favorites to win the title, they lost 71–87 in the semi-final to the eventual winners Žalgiris. They finished third, defeating Teamsystem Bologna 74–63 in the 3rd place game. In the Greek League they were the favorites to win the championship, but despite having the home advantage in the finals against Panathinaikos, they were defeated in the last game of the series at home and lost the title. That was the first time Olympiacos lost a playoff game to Panathinaikos in SEF after 10 consecutive wins.

In the 1999–2000 season, Olympiacos did not make the EuroLeague playoffs, as they were eliminated in the round of 16 by Union Olimpija. On the contrary, they finished first in the regular season of the Greek League and entered the playoffs having home court advantage. But in the semi-finals they played against fourth-placed PAOK and they were eliminated, losing the first game at home and the second one in Thessaloníki. Olympiacos faced AEK for the third place and won.

2000s

2000–2002

In the 2000–01 season, Olympiacos played in the first EuroLeague competition that was organized by EuroLeague Basketball, but despite having home court advantage in the playoffs they were eliminated by Tau Cerámica. In the Greek League Finals, they finished second.

In the 2001–02 season, the club managed to win the Greek Cup, their first trophy since 1997, in a Final Four tournament that was held at Peace and Friendship Stadium. They beat Panathinaikos 83–75 in the semi-final and Maroussi 74–66 in the final. Then they came within one victory of the EuroLeague Final Four. They played in the Top 16 in a group against Panathinaikos, AEK and Union Olimpija, with only the first placed team advancing to the Final Four. After Olympiacos completed an easy 92–75 win over Panathinaikos with Alphonso Ford scoring 21 points in the opening home match, another home win against AEK, and an away win against Olimpija, they played an away game against Panathinaikos and lost 78–88. The score of that game gave the Reds the aggregate advantage in case they finished on the top of the group along with their rivals, a scenario that looked highly probable. However, in the fifth group game, the weakest team of the group, Union Olimpija, stunned Olympiacos in Athens by winning their single game in the group. This put Olympiacos in second place and despite their away win against AEK in the last game of the group, their unexpected loss against Olimpija kept them out of the Final Four in Bologna. In the Greek League the Reds eliminated Peristeri in the quarter-finals and managed to break the home court advantage of Panathinaikos in the first game of the playoffs semi-final with a well-deserved 80–89 win in OAKA and after a thrilling second win at home with 80–76, they eliminated them and made it to the finals. In the finals, they managed to break AEK's home court advantage in the first game of the series (82–74) and after a second comfortable win at SEF in Game 2 (75–70) they were very close to the title. Despite starting the finals with those two comfortable wins, their 2–0 lead did not prove enough as they lost three games in a row and let the title slip away.

Olympiacos was one of the EuroLeague's most dangerous teams in 2002–03 as well. They had a decent regular season, finishing third in a tough group of eight teams and qualified to the next phase at the expense of teams like Real Madrid and Partizan. The club came closer than any team to knocking off the eventual champions FC Barcelona in two heartbreaking games in the EuroLeague Top 16 groups (55–58, 77–80) and proved, despite the fact that they were not at their best during the early 2000s, that they were able to beat any team at any time.

2003–2005 crisis
The 2003–04 and 2004–05 seasons were the worst in the modern history of Olympiacos. In both seasons, the team was eliminated in the Greek Cup and finished in the 8th place of the Greek League. Especially in the latter season, Olympiacos had a dismal performance in the EuroLeague, which filled many of the club's fans with uncertainty.

2006: Rebirth

The 2005–06 season saw the return of the Red giants, which overcame the previous down years with a nice combination of young talent and experienced veterans which paid off for the club.
Players added to the club like Renaldas Seibutis, Quincy Lewis, Panagiotis Vasilopoulos, Georgios Printezis and, above all, Sofoklis Schortsanitis, were viewed by some to be a possible solid core of players for the team for many years to come. That season seemed to be very promising for the Red giants. However, the promising Reds were eliminated from the Greek Cup in their first knock-out match of the competition. Olympiacos survived a difficult EuroLeague regular season and shined in the Top 16, advancing to the quarterfinal playoffs. The Reds were just a win away from making it to the Final Four for the first time since 1999. Maccabi Tel Aviv won the best-of-three playoff series 2–1, but game 3 went down to the wire. Experience proved to be a decisive factor in the final 2 minutes of the game, when the hosts managed to seal a 77–73 win and advanced to the Final Four in Prague. Tyus Edney earned EuroLeague February MVP honors, as well as ranking third in assists at the end of the regular season and second in the Top 16. Olympiacos also shined in its domestic competition, as the Reds made it to the Greek League finals for the first time in five years by surviving a thrilling five-game series against Maroussi. Despite their losing in the final playoff series, it was clear that the Reds were back where they used to be, becoming a team able to challenge for every title.

In the 2006–07 season, with the signings of head coach Pini Gershon and Arvydas Macijauskas, the Reds were one of the favorites to claim the EuroLeague crown, but they did not manage to qualify to the Athens Final Four. They were eliminated from the Greek Cup as well. In the Greek League playoffs, they made it to the finals after winning 3–2 a best of five semi-final against Aris. Although Olympiacos had to overcome their home court disadvantage, they won the last match in Thessaloniki and made it to the best of five finals, having again a home court disadvantage, this time against Panathinaikos. The club had to beat their arch-rivals to win their first Greek Championship since 1997. But they finished second in one of the best final series ever played in the Greek League. At the opening game of the series in Panathinaikos' home, the Reds lost 72–79, but they won the second game in Peace and Friendship Stadium 76–72. In the third match, Olympiacos lost 86–85 in overtime, with the Reds complaining furiously against the referees, who did not call a clear foul against Scoonie Penn with only 3 seconds left in the game. Olympiacos won the next game easily, 78–68 in Piraeus, but in the last away game, the Reds lost 76–89.

2007–2008 season

In the 2007–08 season, Olympiacos was once again considered amongst the favorites to reach the Final Four of the EuroLeague. It was also considered one of the two favorites, along with Panathinaikos, to win the Greek championship. In the Greek League regular season the team had a record of 22 wins and 4 defeats, and had the second most prolific offensive team in the league. In the quarter-finals of the playoffs, Olympiacos swept AEK Athens in a best-of-three series and in the semi-finals they beat Maroussi in a best-of-five series, 3–2. They finally finished second, losing in the finals of the Greek League. They also reached the final of the Greek Cup after 4 years, but they did not manage to take the title. In the EuroLeague, the team qualified for the third phase of the competition (quarter-finals). They played against the eventual winners CSKA Moscow and despite grabbing a thrilling away win in the first match of the series in CSKA Universal Sports Hall in Moscow (76–74 with Qyntel Woods scoring 20 points and Lynn Greer sinking a spectacular game-winning buzzer beater which ended CSKA's 27-game winning streak at home), they lost the second game in Piraeus and were eventually eliminated by 2–1 wins after the third game in Moscow.

2008–2009 season: Return to Euroleague Final Four

The 2008–09 season began with high expectations due to a big budget and a great roster with players like Josh Childress, Theo Papaloukas, Miloš Teodosić, Nikola Vujčić, Ioannis Bourousis, Lynn Greer, Panagiotis Vasilopoulos, Sofoklis Schortsanitis and Georgios Printezis. The club's season was only moderately successful however, as they reached the finals of both the Greek Cup and the Greek Championship. In the Greek Championship regular season, the team set a record with 25 wins against only 1 defeat, but in the finals of the Greek League playoffs, they lost the series 3–1, despite having the home court advantage. In the EuroLeague, they reached the Final Four for the first time in 10 years, eliminating Real Madrid with 3–1 wins. Having secured the home advantage, they won the first two games in Piraeus (88–79 and 79–73) and managed to secure an away win (75–78) in Madrid in Game 4 of the series, thus advancing to the EuroLeague Final Four after 1999. In the Final Four in Berlin, they faced arch-rivals Panathinaikos in a close, heartbreaking thriller: Olympiacos trailed by two points and had the ball for the last possession. The ball went to Bourousis but his close shot bounced out, with Childress being unable to score with a last-second tip as well. Despite the loss in a match that could have easily gone either way, the team's great effort and the club's return to the elite of European basketball were clear signs of their future success.

2009–2010 season: EuroLeague runners-up
The 2009–10 season was the best in a long time for Olympiacos. The management wanted to bring another big player to the team, after Josh Childress. And they did, agreeing with the Lithuanian NBA player of the Denver Nuggets, Linas Kleiza. With the help of these two and under the guidance of coach Panagiotis Giannakis the club managed to take the Greek Cup defeating their arch-rivals Panathinaikos 68–64 in the final.
In the EuroLeague, the Reds had an impressive run in the regular season and the Top 16, finishing as group winners in both phases. In the quarter-final playoffs, the faced the Polish champions Asseco Prokom and eliminated them with 3–1 wins, reaching for the second consecutive season the EuroLeague Final Four which was held in Paris. In the semi-final the team managed to defeat Partizan 83–80 in overtime in a thrilling match, with Kleiza scoring 19 points. Olympiacos returned to the EuroLeague Final after 1997, facing Regal FC Barcelona, the very team they had beaten in the 1997 Final. History did not repeat itself, as Olympiacos lost 68–86 to FC Barcelona in the final.
In the Greek Championship finals, the club lost 3–1 wins to Panathinaikos after an intense third game that would have put them ahead 1–2, with the Reds having again huge complaints over the referees' performance. The fourth game of the series was disrupted several times and the arena was cleared of all fans to complete the remaining few minutes.

2010s

2010–2011 season
In July 2010, Olympiacos offered a three-year contract worth €13,200,000 euros gross income to the famous Greek guard Vassilis Spanoulis, and came to an agreement with the player. The great Serbian coach Dušan Ivković agreed with the club, and with a roster of players such as Miloš Teodosić, Vassilis Spanoulis, Theo Papaloukas, Loukas Mavrokefalidis, Jamon Gordon, Rasho Nesterović, and Ioannis Bourousis, Olympiacos became a favorite to win the 2010–11 Euroleague. In the opening game of the Top 16, Olympiacos got a 70–84 defeat in Athens, against Fenerbahçe Ülker, but one month later, Olympiacos defeated the Turkish champions with a 65–80 win in Istanbul, and took the first place of the Top 16 Group H. In the quarter-finals, Olympiacos faced Montepaschi Siena. In the first game of a best-of-five series, the Reds achieved a great performance, defeating Montepaschi with an 89–41 score, at the Peace and Friendship stadium, in Athens, but the Italian club managed to win the second game (65–82), breaking the home advantage of the Reds. Olympiacos did not manage to win any of the next two away games, and got eliminated from the 2011 EuroLeague Final Four. On 15 May 2011, Olympiacos defeated arch-rivals Panathinaikos, 74–68, in the Greek Cup Final, and won the ninth Greek Cup in the club's history. In the Greek League, Olympiacos took the first place in the regular season, but despite earning home-court advantage for the finals, they lost the first game at home, and suffered a 3–1 defeat in a best-of-five series, as they let a chance at the championship slip away.

2011–2012 season: European and Greek champions

In the summer of 2011, Olympiacos saw many experienced players leave the team, after a reduction of the team's budget by over 50%. The youthful team under coach Dušan Ivković initially heavily depended on team leader Vassilis Spanoulis, losing games regularly when he was not playing. The team that the press thought might not even qualify for the Top 16, improved dramatically over the course of the season, and under the great performances of Vassilis Spanoulis, Georgios Printezis, Kostas Papanikolaou, Kyle Hines, Joey Dorsey, Pero Antić, Acie Law, Kostas Sloukas, and Vangelis Mantzaris, Olympiacos managed to reach the 2011–12 Euroleague Final Four in Istanbul, after breaking the home-advantage of the Italian champions, Montepaschi Siena, winning with a 75–82 score in the first game of a best-of-five series in Italy, in a reversal of the previous season's quarter-finals. Going to Istanbul as an outsider, Olympiacos upset the odds, and beat the two favourites, FC Barcelona Regal in the semi-final, with a score 68–64, and CSKA Moscow in the final, with a 62–61 score, coming back after trailing by 19 points in the most dramatic final in the history of EuroLeague. Printezis scored a game-winner, off an assist from Spanoulis, with a few tenths of a second left, to complete the epic comeback, and give Olympiacos the win, and the second EuroLeague Championship in their history. Vassilis Spanoulis, the man who provided the assist for Printezis' buzzer-beating hook-shot, was voted Final Four MVP. The most successful season of the Reds since 1997, was completed by seizing the Greek Championship as well. They eliminated PAOK in the quarter-finals, and Panionios in the semi-finals, securing their spot in the Greek Finals undefeated. They entered the Greek Finals having the home-court advantage, after their first place in the regular season, and their impressive 23–1 record. There, Olympiacos faced their arch-rivals Panathinaikos, and won the best-of-five series 3–2 (84–78, 84–72, 82–76), celebrating the tenth Greek Championship in their history, and their first since 1997.

2012–2013 season: Back-to-back European champions

After the end of a dreamy season, both domestically and internationally, legendary coach Dušan Ivković decided to leave the club, leaving the club's owners, the Angelopoulos brothers, with a hard decision regarding his replacement. The club's owners decided to hire the highly promising Greek coach Georgios Bartzokas (who had very successful tenures in Marousi and Panionios) as the new head coach of the European Champions. Stratos Perperoglou, Giorgi Shermadini and the two-time NBA Champion Josh Powell joined the team to replace Marko Kešelj, Joey Dorsey, and Lazaros Papadopoulos. In May 2013, Olympiacos, under the guidance of coach Bartzokas, became EuroLeague Champion for the second year in a row, becoming the first and only Greek club, and the only club since Maccabi Tel Aviv in European-wide basketball, to become back-to-back EuroLeague Champions, in the Euroleague Basketball Company era (Euroleague 2000–01 season to present), and only the third club in history since the establishment of the modern era Final Four format in 1987–88 season, to achieve that honour. After a solid display in both the regular season and the Top 16, they qualified for the quarter-finals, having earned the home advantage. They faced Anadolu Efes, and managed to eliminate the Turkish side, by winning the best-of-five series 3–2, after a thrilling Game 5 in SEF. Olympiacos managed to rally from a 15-point second-quarter deficit to win the game, with an 82–72 scoreline, thus securing the chance to defend their European crown in the Final Four. In the Final Four, Olympiacos managed to put forth two outstanding basketball displays. After rolling past CSKA Moscow with a smashing 69–52 win in the semi-final, they managed to beat Real Madrid 100–88 in the final at London's The O2 Arena, roaring back from a 17-point deficit in the first quarter, and scoring 90 points in the remaining three-quarters. EuroLeague MVP Vassilis Spanoulis led the charge with 22 points (all in the second half), and was eventually voted Final Four MVP for the second consecutive season, and third overall in his career. Thus joining Toni Kukoč, as the only two players in history to achieve that distinction on three occasions. Acie Law scored 20 points with 5 assists, and Kyle Hines added 12 points with 3 blocks, one of which was a spectacular chase-down block on a fast break layup attempt by Nikola Mirotić.

2013 FIBA Intercontinental champions
After winning the EuroLeague championship for the second straight season, Olympiacos qualified to play at the 2013 edition of the FIBA Intercontinental Cup, against the 2013 FIBA Americas League champions, Pinheiros Sky, for the official Club World Cup title. The two-game aggregate score series was hosted in Ginásio José Corrêa Arena, in Barueri, São Paulo, and Olympiacos dominated the series. They won both games quite convincingly (2–0), winning the first game of the series by a score of 81 to 70, and the second game by a score of 86 to 69. Team captain Vassilis Spanoulis was named the 2013 FIBA Intercontinental Cup MVP. Olympiacos lifted the trophy in front of their ecstatic fans from the Greek community of Brazil, and celebrated their third international title in less than 2 years. In the EuroLeague, they reached the quarter-finals, where they played against Real Madrid, the very team they had beaten in the previous year's final. Real Madrid entered the series with home-court advantage, and Olympiacos couldn't overturn the situation, losing the series 3–2 to the Spanish champions, after five intense games, and missing the chance to defend their back-to-back European crown.

2015- 2017 season: Euroleague runners-up, Greek Champions

In the 2014–15 season, Olympiacos had another great season, reaching the EuroLeague Final, and seizing the Greek Championship in a convincing way. In EuroLeague, after an impressive run in the regular season and the Top 16, they qualified for the quarter-finals for the tenth consecutive season (2006–2015), which was an all-time record in European basketball history at the time, shared with FC Barcelona, the very club they were drawn to play against for a Final Four spot. FC Barcelona entered the series with the home-court advantage, and won the first game at home. Olympiacos bounced back from the loss, and managed to put on a top-class display in Game 2, beating FC Barcelona 63–76, at Palau Blaugrana. With the home-advantage in their hands, the Reds beat FC Barcelona twice at Peace and Friendship Stadium, winning the playoff series 3–1. Game 4 of the series was nothing less than a dramatic thriller. The game was tied at 68–68, with only 5.2 seconds remaining on game the clock. Olympiacos had possession of the ball, and just a small amount of time for a last play. The ball went to Georgios Printezis (hero of the 2012 EuroLeague Final), who hit a buzzer-beating three-pointer to secure the Final Four spot for his team (71–68), with Olympiacos fans erupting in frenetic celebrations. In the Final Four in Madrid, Olympiacos beat CSKA Moscow, 70–68, in the semi-final, coming back from a 9-point deficit in the last four minutes of the game. Captain Vassilis Spanoulis led Olympiacos to the final, by scoring 11 points in the last minutes of the 4th quarter, by hitting some really tough shots in the game's last crucial minutes. In the EuroLeague Final, Olympiacos did not manage to win their third EuroLeague title in four years, as they lost to rivals Real Madrid, who played the final at their home court. Despite the title loss, Olympiacos proved yet again their dominating presence in European basketball, as they had become the most successful club in European basketball since 2008, with two EuroLeague Championships (2012, 2013), three other EuroLeague Finals appearances (2010, 2015, 2017), and six EuroLeague Final Four appearances in seven years (2009, 2010, 2012, 2013, 2015, 2017).

In Greece, Olympiacos had a great regular season, ending up with an impressive record of 25 wins and only 1 defeat. In the playoffs, they reached the finals, after eliminating Aris in the semi-finals (3–1 series win). In the finals, they totally dominated the series, and swept their arch-rivals Panathinaikos, with a 3–0 series win (76–70, 69–76, 93–74). Winning the 2015 Greek Championship in convincing fashion. Team head coach Ioannis Sfairopoulos' guidance, as well as the team's solid performance, both defensively and offensively, paved the way for the historic 3–0 series sweep in the Greek League Finals, which was met with big celebrations from Olympiacos fans, at the title ceremony in SEF.

Withdrawal from the league in 2019 with the motto: "until the end"

The 2018–19 season was the most turbulent in Olympiacos and Greek basketball history. It was the season that the ongoing feud between Olympiacos and Panathinaikos peaked, following Olympiacos decisions after their long-lasting protests for the relationship of the Hellenic Basketball Federation with Panathinaikos, the officiating in the games between the two arch-rivals and the exclusion of EuroLeague referees from national competitions.

Initially, in the 2018–19 Greek Cup semi-final against Panathinaikos, Olympiacos decided to withdraw and to not return for the second half of the game in protest for the referees decisions, despite the possible sanctions for the team for leaving the game. In the following day, Olympiacos announced that they would not play again any league or cup game against Panathinaikos, unless it was officiated exclusively by foreign referees, as well as any national competition game against any opponent, if any of the forementioned Cup semi-final's referees (Anastopoulos, Manos and Panagiotou) was set to officiate; furthermore, Giannakopoulos was not anymore allowed to enter the Peace and Friendship Stadium under any capacity he might be using, also asking from the authorities to investigate the extremely low betting odds for Panathinaikos to win the Cup semi-final, after the referees' names were announced. At first, Olympiacos was punished with a deduction of 6 points from the same year's league table.

Olympiacos announced that their decisions were fully supported by the parent club's Olympiacos CFP chairman, Michalis Kountouris. As the time for the game of the 2018–19 Greek League's second round was approaching, Olympiacos officially informed the Hellenic Basketball Federation that they insist on their position not to play any game officiated by the three forementioned referees, or any game against Panathinaikos that will not be officiated by foreign referees. Previously, Panathinaikos had expressed their opposition to the demand of the Reds. After the announcement of the Greek referees who were going to officiate the forthcoming derby, Olympiacos announced that they would not participate in the game, and even a last minute meeting under the Greek Deputy Minister for Sports ended with a quarrelling between the people of the two clubs and with Panathinaikos' owner Giannakopoulos cursing Olympiacos' owners and chanting about the forthcoming relegation of his club's eternal enemy.

Panathinaikos was awarded the away win for this game by 20–0, and Olympiacos was penalized with a 6-point deduction and a fine, which were added to the previous deduction for the Cup game that Olympiacos had appealed. Totally, Olympiacos were deducted 12 points from their league total, plus one more point that was not awarded to them because of the forfeit in the league's derby. Later Olympiacos penalty was reduced to a 2-point deduction for the Cup game, which meant that the total deduction from the league table was 8 points.

For the last matchday of the league's regular season, the central refereeing committee announced that Anastopoulos, one of the three referees of the much discussed Cup semi-final, was drawn to officiate Olympiacos' home game against Promitheas Patras, after Giannakopoulos pressure for the three referees to be included in the draw for the Reds game. That meant that if Olympiacos insisted on their position not to take part in a game officiated by Anastopoulos, Manos and Panagiotou, then the red giant would be relegated to the second division, a penalty for any team that forfeits two league games. Finally, Anastopoulos was replaced after his request not to officiate the game, which took place regularly, something that led Panathinaikos to protest with their withdrawal from their last regular season game against Kymi, which was awarded the win and escaped relegation, while the Greens were punished with a 6-point deduction. 

In the final standings of the regular season, Panathinaikos with −6 points and Olympiacos with −8 points, and one more point not awarded to each one, were ranked in the 3rd and 6th place respectively despite having the two best records, which meant that they were to play against each other in the first playoffs round. However, Olympiacos proceeded to legal action, asking from the high council for the solution of athletic disputes to void the last matchday of the regular season, pointing out that all referees assignments were illegal, thus the playoffs were postponed for one week. The Hellenic Basketball Clubs Association decided to confirm the final standings, with Olympiacos talking about violation of the sporting legislation.

Olympiacos announced that they would not compete in the playoffs against Panathinaikos, since not only were foreign referees not appointed, but also two of the Cup semi-final referees (Anastopoulos and Manos) were drawn to officiate the first playoffs derby. In the face of this possibility EuroLeague Basketball president, Jordi Bertomeu, accused the Hellenic Basketball Federation of not intervening to resolve the dispute between Olympiacos and Panathinaikos, describing the situation of the Greek basketball and the forthcoming relegation of Olympiacos as unthinkable. Olympiacos, finally, did not appear in the first playoffs game at Panathinaikos home arena, which meant that the Reds would get relegated to the second division for forfeiting two league games,  Later, the Hellenic Basketball Clubs Association officially announced the relegation of Olympiacos to the Greek A2 Basket League, due to the non-participation in a league playoffs game; Olympiacos were eliminated for the rest of the playoffs and were also placed at the bottom of the final standings, with all their results voided and non-replaceable.

The club's former coach, Ioannis Sfairopoulos, stated that Olympiacos chose the extreme way to change a situation that existed for years, something they tried to do in various ways in the past but nothing worked, and that they have to change the status in Greek basketball. Panathinaikos' coach, Rick Pitino, stated that Greek basketball needs Olympiacos and asked from them to change their mind. Hellenic Basketball Federation's president, George Vassilakopoulos, after his long-lasting silence, stated: "It will be a disaster for basketball, for such a great club with a history like Olympiacos to play in the second division and a solution must be reached fast. I’m clear about this". Newly appointed Greek Deputy Minister for Sports, Lefteris Avgenakis, and Vassilakopoulos, both agreed that Olympiacos should be part of the Greek Basket League and that a solution should be found, while his predecessor, Giorgos Vasiliadis, also accused of his passive stance, revealed that he had requested FIBA to send foreign referees to the league games. However, no action was taken maybe due to Panathinaikos constant threats that they would withdraw from the league, if Olympiacos remained in the first division. In the meantime, Olympiacos appeals about the league last matchday's legality were rejected, and they decided to take the Hellenic Basketball Clubs Association to the sports court.

Finally, Olympiacos announced that they decided to register an entirely separate squad for the 2019–20 Greek second division and 2019–20 Greek Cup, for reasons of legality, and that squad would be a secondary "B" team, with a different name (Olympiacos B Development Team) and using the Peace and Friendship Stadium's practice court as their home arena, with the senior team playing exclusively in EuroLeague, which "has all the elements that characterize a serious, modern and reliable league", according to their announcement. After losing the first EuroLeague game of the season against ASVEL, Olympiacos and David Blatt parted ways. His assistant Kęstutis Kemzūra became the head coach of the team until the end of the season.

Return and treble in 2021-22
The situation in the Greek federation changed. New faces took over the fate of Greek basketball. Olympiacos returned to the championship and in the 2021-22 season won the championship, the cup and the super cup, while also competing in the final four of the Euroleague.

Kit manufacturers and shirt sponsors
Since 1985, Olympiacos had a specific kit manufacturer and a shirt sponsor. The following table shows in detail the shirt sponsors and kit manufacturers of Olympiacos by year:

Arena
Olympiacos' long-time home court is the Peace and Friendship Stadium (Greek: Στάδιο Ειρήνης και Φιλίας or ΣΕΦ – SEF), which is an indoor arena that is located in Faliro, Piraeus, exactly opposite of the Olympiacos FC football department's home stadium, Karaiskakis Stadium. The arena opened in 1985, and Olympiacos has been using it since 1991. It was originally one of the biggest European indoor arenas, with an original capacity of 17,000 seats, however, its capacity was reduced to 12,171 seats for the 2004 Olympics.

Currently, it can seat up to 14,950 with lower additional tiers of seats added to it. 12,000 (11,640 permanent seats, and 360 temporary seats) is the current capacity of the arena for Olympiacos home games. SEF hosted the indoor volleyball tournament of the 2004 Summer Olympics, and it was also the host venue of the EuroBasket 1987, and the 1998 FIBA World Championship. The arena was renovated for the 2004 Summer Olympics.

Players

Current roster

Depth chart

Squad changes for the 2022–2023 season

In

Out

Honours

Domestic competitions
 Greek League
 Winners (13): 1948–49, 1959–60, 1975–76, 1977–78, 1992–93, 1993–94, 1994–95, 1995–96, 1996–97, 2011–12, 2014–15, 2015–16, 2021–22
 Runners-up (23): 1956–57, 1971–72, 1972–73, 1974–75, 1976–77, 1978–79, 1979–80, 1980–81, 1985–86, 1991–92, 1998–99, 2000–01, 2001–02, 2005–06, 2006–07, 2007–08, 2008–09, 2009–10, 2010–11, 2012–13, 2013–14, 2016–17, 2017–18
 Greek Cup
 Winners (11): 1975–76, 1976–77, 1977–78, 1979–80, 1993–94, 1996–97, 2001–02, 2009–10, 2010–11, 2021–22, 2022–23
 Runners-up (9): 1978–79, 1982–83, 1985–86, 2003–04, 2007–08, 2008–09, 2011–12, 2012–13, 2017–18
 Greek Super Cup
 Winners (1): 2022
 Greek B Basket League (2nd tier)
 Winners (1): 1966–67
 Runners-up (1): 2020–21

European competitions
 EuroLeague
 Winners (3): 1996–97, 2011–12, 2012–13
 Runners-up (5): 1993–94, 1994–95, 2009–10, 2014–15, 2016–17
 3rd place (1): 1998–99
 4th place (2): 2008–09, 2021–22
 Final Four (11): 1994, 1995, 1997, 1999, 2009, 2010, 2012, 2013, 2015, 2017, 2022

Worldwide competitions
 FIBA Intercontinental Cup
 Winners (1): 2013
 McDonald's Championship
 Runners-up (1): 1997

Individual club awards
 Triple Crown
 Winners (1): 1996–97
 Double
 Winners (5): 1975–76, 1977–78, 1993–94, 1996–97, 2021-22
 "One Team" Gold Award:
 Winners (2): 2021, 2022
 One Team Silver Awards:
 Winners (2): 2018, 2020

Performance in international competitions

International record

The road to the 1997 EuroLeague victory

The road to the 2012 Euroleague victory

The road to the 2013 Euroleague victory

The biggest wins in FIBA Champions Cup and EuroLeague

Home wins

Away wins

The biggest wins in FIBA Saporta Cup

The biggest wins in FIBA Korać Cup

Matches against NBA teams
On 18 October 1997, Olympiacos became the first Greek team to play against an NBA team. As European Champions, they played against the back-to-back NBA champions, the Chicago Bulls, in the final of the 1997 McDonald's Championship in Paris. The game was played under zone-friendly European rules (the games between NBA and FIBA teams were played under a mixture of NBA and FIBA rules at that time), but, out of respect for the Bulls, Olympiacos never used a zone defense. Olympiacos lost 78–104, with the legendary Michael Jordan scoring 27 points in the game. In October 2009, Olympiacos visited the United States on their 2009 NBA tour, and played against the San Antonio Spurs, at the AT&T Center, and against the Cleveland Cavaliers, at Quicken Loans Arena.

Seasons
{| class="wikitable" style="text-align: center"
|-
!|Seasons
!|Greek League
!|Greek Cup
!|Europe
!|Head Coach
!|Roster
|-
| 1945–46
| Did not participate
| style="background:red;"| "There was no organization"
| style="background:red;"| "There was no organization"
| 
|Petros Dimitropoulos, Ksenofon Nikolaidis, Alexandros Koutsoukos, Giorgos Andreadis, Spiros Andreadis, Anagnostopoulos, Michopoulos
|-
| 1946–47
| style="background:#cd7f32;"| 3rd place
| style="background:red;"| "There was no organization"
| style="background:red;"| "There was no organization"
|
|Petros Dimitropoulos, Xenophon Nikolaidis, Alexandros Koutsoukos, Emmanouil Chatzinikolaou, Anagnostopoulos, Michopoulos
|-
| 1947–48
| style="background:red;"| "There was no organization"
| style="background:red;"| "There was no organization"
| style="background:red;"| "There was no organization"
|
| Ioannis Spanoudakis, Alekos Spanoudakis, Alexandros Koutsoukos, Emmanouil Chatzinikolaou, Petros Dimitropoulos, Xenophon Nikolaidis
|-
| 1948–49
| style="background:gold;"| Πρωταθλητής
| style="background:red;"| Δεν υπήρξε διοργάνωση
| style="background:red;"| Δεν υπήρξε διοργάνωση
| Γιάννης Σπανουδάκης
| Γιάννης Σπανουδάκης, Αλέκος Σπανουδάκης, Στυλιανός Τσικάτος, Εμμανουήλ Χατζηνικολάου, Αλέξανδρος Κουτσούκος, Μπάμπης Γερακαράκης, Αλέκος Σιδηρόπουλος, Σινόπουλος, Γουνόπουλος, Αρκουδέας
|-
| 1949–50
| style="background:#cd7f32;"| 3η θέση
| style="background:red;"| Δεν υπήρξε διοργάνωση
| style="background:red;"| Δεν υπήρξε διοργάνωση
| Γιάννης Σπανουδάκης
| Γιάννης Σπανουδάκης, Αλέκος Σπανουδάκης, Αλέξανδρος Κουτσούκος, Εμμανουήλ Χατζηνικολάου, Μπάμπης Γερακαράκης, Αλέκος Σιδηρόπουλος, Σινόπουλος, Γουνόπουλος, Αρκουδέας
|-
| 1950–51
| style="background:#cd7f32;"| 3η θέση
| style="background:red;"| Δεν υπήρξε διοργάνωση
| style="background:red;"| Δεν υπήρξε διοργάνωση
| Γιάννης Σπανουδάκης
| Γιάννης Σπανουδάκης, Αλέκος Σπανουδάκης, Αλέξανδρος Κουτσούκος, Μπάμπης Γερακαράκης, Αλέκος Σιδηρόπουλος, Σινόπουλος, Γουνόπουλος, Αρκουδέας
|-
| 1951–52
| style="background:red;"| Δεν υπήρξε διοργάνωση
| style="background:red;"| Δεν υπήρξε διοργάνωση
| style="background:red;"| Δεν υπήρξε διοργάνωση
| Γιάννης Σπανουδάκης
| Γιάννης Σπανουδάκης, Αλέκος Σπανουδάκης, Αλέξανδρος Κουτσούκος, Μπάμπης Γερακαράκης, Αλέκος Σιδηρόπουλος, Σινόπουλος, Γουνόπουλος, Αρκουδέας
|-
| 1952–53
| style="background:#cd7f32;"| 3η θέση
| style="background:red;"| Δεν υπήρξε διοργάνωση
| style="background:red;"| Δεν υπήρξε διοργάνωση
| Γιάννης Σπανουδάκης
| Γιάννης Σπανουδάκης, Αλέκος Σπανουδάκης, Αλέξανδρος Κουτσούκος, Μπάμπης Γερακαράκης, Αλέκος Σιδηρόπουλος, Σινόπουλος, Γουνόπουλος, Αρκουδέας
|-
| 1953–54
| style="background:#cd7f32;"| 3η θέση
| style="background:red;"| Δεν υπήρξε διοργάνωση
| style="background:red;"| Δεν υπήρξε διοργάνωση
| Γιάννης Σπανουδάκης
| Γιάννης Σπανουδάκης, Αλέκος Σπανουδάκης, Αλέξανδρος Κουτσούκος, Μπάμπης Γερακαράκης, Σινόπουλος, Γουνόπουλος
|-
| 1954–55
| style="background:#cd7f32;"| 3η θέση
| style="background:red;"| Δεν υπήρξε διοργάνωση
| style="background:red;"| Δεν υπήρξε διοργάνωση
| Γιάννης Σπανουδάκης
| Γιάννης Σπανουδάκης, Αλέκος Σπανουδάκης, Θεόδωρος Βαμβακούσης, Μίμης Δουράτσος, Μπάμπης Γερακαράκης, Αργυρόπουλος, Σινόπουλος, Γουνόπουλος
|-
| 1955–56
| style="background:red;"| Δεν υπήρξε διοργάνωση
| style="background:red;"| Δεν υπήρξε διοργάνωση
| style="background:red;"| Δεν υπήρξε διοργάνωση
| Γιάννης Σπανουδάκης
| Γιάννης Σπανουδάκης, Αλέκος Σπανουδάκης, Θεόδωρος Βαμβακούσης, Μίμης Δουράτσος, Μπάμπης Γερακαράκης, Αργυρόπουλος
|-
| 1956–57
| style="background:silver;"| Φιναλίστ
| style="background:red;"| Δεν υπήρξε διοργάνωση
| style="background:red;"| Δεν υπήρξε διοργάνωση
| Γιάννης Σπανουδάκης
| Γιάννης Σπανουδάκης, Αλέκος Σπανουδάκης, Θεόδωρος Βαμβακούσης, Μίμης Δουράτσος, Μπάμπης Γερακαράκης, Αργυρόπουλος, Μπίσυλλας
|-
| 1957–58
| 6η θέση
| style="background:red;"| Δεν υπήρξε διοργάνωση
| Δεν αγωνίστηκε
| Γιάννης Σπανουδάκης
| Γιάννης Σπανουδάκης, Αλέκος Σπανουδάκης, Θεόδωρος Βαμβακούσης, Μίμης Δουράτσος, Μπάμπης Γερακαράκης, Αργυρόπουλος, Μπίσυλλας
|-
| 1958–59
|  4η θέση
| style="background:red;"| Δεν υπήρξε διοργάνωση
| Δεν αγωνίστηκε
| Γιάννης Σπανουδάκης
| Γιάννης Σπανουδάκης, Αλέκος Σπανουδάκης, Θεόδωρος Βαμβακούσης, Μίμης Δουράτσος, Μπάμπης Γερακαράκης, Αργυρόπουλος, Πολυχρονίου
|-
| 1959–60
| style="background:gold;"| Πρωταθλητής
| style="background:red;"| Δεν υπήρξε διοργάνωση
| Δεν αγωνίστηκε
| Γιάννης Σπανουδάκης
| Γιάννης Σπανουδάκης, Αλέκος Σπανουδάκης, Θεόδωρος Βαμβακούσης, Βασίλης Φασιλής, Νίκος Νικολαϊδης, Μάρκος Καλούδης, Μίμης Δουράτσος, Μπάμπης Γερακαράκης, Αργυρόπουλος, Πολυχρονίου, Σπανός, Καζουνίδης
|-
| 1960–61
| Εκτός τελικής φάσης
| style="background:red;"| Δεν υπήρξε διοργάνωση
| Κύπελλο Πρωταθλητριών Προκριματικός Γύρος
| Γιάννης Σπανουδάκης
| Γιάννης Σπανουδάκης, Αλέκος Σπανουδάκης, Θεόδωρος Βαμβακούσης, Μάκης Κατσαφάδος, Βασίλης Φασιλής, Θύμιος Φιλίππου, Μάρκος Καλούδης, Μίμης Δουράτσος, Νίκος Νικολαϊδης, Μπάμπης Γερακαράκης, Μεϊμάρης, Αργυρόπουλος, Πολυχρονίου, Καζουνίδης
|-
| 1961–62
| Εκτός τελικής φάσης
| style="background:red;"| Δεν υπήρξε διοργάνωση
| Δεν αγωνίστηκε
| Γιάννης Σπανουδάκης
| Γιάννης Σπανουδάκης, Αλέκος Σπανουδάκης, Θεόδωρος Βαμβακούσης, Μάκης Κατσαφάδος, Μάρκος Καλούδης, Νίκος Νικολαϊδης
|-
| 1962–63
| Εκτός τελικής φάσης
| style="background:red;"| Δεν υπήρξε διοργάνωση
| Δεν αγωνίστηκε
| Γιάννης Σπανουδάκης
| Γιάννης Σπανουδάκης, Αλέκος Σπανουδάκης, Μάκης Κατσαφάδος, Θεόδωρος Βαμβακούσης, Μάρκος Καλούδης, Νίκος Νικολαϊδης
|-
| 1963–64
| 10η θέση 
| style="background:red;"| Δεν υπήρξε διοργάνωση
| Δεν αγωνίστηκε
| Γιάννης Κουτσουλέντης, Γιάννης Σπανουδάκης
| Γιάννης Σπανουδάκης, Αλέκος Σπανουδάκης, Σταύρος Κατσαφάδος, Μάκης Κατσαφάδος, Αρης Γκιόκας, Μάρκος Καλούδης, Νίκος Νικολαϊδης, Θεόδωρος Βαμβακούσης, Δημήτρης Κοντογιάννης, Μανώλης Αράπης, Πέτρος Πολυκανδριώτης, Γιώργος Μαλτίδης, Νάσος Χλέλμης, Κώστας Περδικάρης
|-
| 1964–65
| Β' κατηγορία
| style="background:red;"| Δεν υπήρξε διοργάνωση
| Δεν αγωνίστηκε
| Γιάννης Κουτσουλέντης, Γιάννης Σπανουδάκης
| Θανάσης Ράμμος, Μάκης Κατσαφάδος, Σταύρος Κατσαφάδος, Στηβ Πλερόπουλος, Πέτρος Πολυκανδριώτης, Γιώργος Μαλτίδης, Νάσος Χλέλμης, Μάρκος Καλούδης, Νίκος Νικολαϊδης
|-
| 1965–66
| Β' κατηγορία
| style="background:red;"| Δεν υπήρξε διοργάνωση
| Δεν αγωνίστηκε
| Γιάννης Σπανουδάκης
| Θανάσης Ράμμος, Μάκης Κατσαφάδος, Σταύρος Κατσαφάδος, Πέτρος Πολυκανδριώτης, Γιώργος Μαλτίδης, Νάσος Χλέλμης, Στηβ Πλερόπουλος, Νίκος Νικολαϊδης 
|-
| 1966–67
| Β' κατηγορία - 1η θέση (άνοδος στην Α' εθνική κατηγορία)
| style="background:red;"| Δεν υπήρξε διοργάνωση
| Δεν αγωνίστηκε
| Φαίδων Ματθαίου 
| Θανάσης Ράμμος, Μάκης Κατσαφάδος, Σταύρος Κατσαφάδος, Στηβ Πλερόπουλος, Πέτρος Πολυκανδριώτης, Γιώργος Μαλτίδης, Μανώλης Ευστρατίου, Άλτιν Σπίρμαν
|-
| 1967–68
| 4η θέση
| style="background:red;"| Δεν υπήρξε διοργάνωση
| Δεν αγωνίστηκε
| Φαίδων Ματθαίου 
| Τόλης Σπανός, Θανάσης Ράμμος, Στέλιος Αμερικάνος, Μάκης Κατσαφάδος, Δημήτρης Συμεωνίδης, Πέτρος Πολυκανδριώτης, Θανάσης Παπανάγνος, Μανώλης Ευστρατίου, Στηβ Πλερόπουλος, Άλτιν Σπίρμαν 
|-
| 1968–69
| 5η θέση
| style="background:red;"| Δεν υπήρξε διοργάνωση
| Δεν αγωνίστηκε
| Φαίδων Ματθαίου 
| Τόλης Σπανός, Θανάσης Ράμμος, Μάκης Κατσαφαδος, Σταύρος Κατσαφάδος, Στέλιος Αμερικάνος, Δημήτρης Συμεωνίδης, Θανάσης Παπανάγνος, Μανώλης Ευστρατίου
|-
| 1969–70
| 5η θέση
| style="background:red;"| Δεν υπήρξε διοργάνωση
| Δεν αγωνίστηκε
| Φαίδων Ματθαίου 
| Τόλης Σπανός, Θανάσης Ράμμος, Μάκης Κατσαφαδος, Σταύρος Κατσαφάδος, Δημήτρης Συμεωνίδης, Θανάσης Παπανάγνος, Μανώλης Ευστρατίου
|-
| 1970–71
| style="background:#cd7f32;"| 3η θέση
| style="background:red;"| Δεν υπήρξε διοργάνωση
| Δεν αγωνίστηκε
| Φαίδων Ματθαίου 
| Τόλης Σπανός, Θανάσης Ράμμος, Μάκης Κατσαφαδος, Σταύρος Κατσαφάδος, Δημήτρης Συμεωνίδης, Θανάσης Παπανάγνος, Μανώλης Ευστρατίου
|-
| 1971–72
| style="background:silver;"| Φιναλίστ
| style="background:red;"| Δεν υπήρξε διοργάνωση
| Δεν αγωνίστηκε
| Φαίδων Ματθαίου 
| Τόλης Σπανός, Θανάσης Ράμμος, Μάκης Κατσαφαδος, Δημήτρης Συμεωνίδης, Θανάσης Παπανάγνος, Μανώλης Ευστρατίου
|-
| 1972–73
| style="background:silver;"| Φιναλίστ
| style="background:red;"| Δεν υπήρξε διοργάνωση
| Κύπελλο Κυπελλούχων Φάση των 16
| Φαίδων Ματθαίου 
| Τσάρλι Γιέλβερτον, Στιβ Γιατζόγλου, Γιώργος Καστρινάκης, Θανάσης Ράμμος, Παύλος Διάκουλας, Γιώργος Μπαρλάς, Τόλης Σπανός, Μάκης Κατσαφάδος, Μανώλης Ευστρατίου
|-
| 1973–74
| 6η θέση
| style="background:red;"| Δεν υπήρξε διοργάνωση
| Κύπελλο Κυπελλούχων Φάση των 16
| Φαίδων Ματθαίου
| Στιβ Γιατζόγλου, Γιώργος Καστρινάκης, Παύλος Διάκουλας, Θανάσης Ράμμος, Γιώργος Μπαρλάς, Τόλης Σπανός, Μάκης Κατσαφάδος, Μανώλης Ευστρατίου
|-
| 1974–75
| style="background:silver;"| Φιναλίστ
| style="background:red;"| Δεν υπήρξε διοργάνωση
| Δεν αγωνίστηκε
| Φαίδων Ματθαίου 
| Στιβ Γιατζόγλου, Γιώργος Καστρινάκης, Παύλος Διάκουλας, Γιώργος Μπαρλάς, Νίκος Σισμανίδης, Γιάννης Γκαρώνης, Κίμωνας Κοκορόγιαννης, Θανάσης Ράμμος, Τόλης Σπανός, Μάκης Κατσαφάδος, Πολ Μελίνι, Μανώλης Ευστρατίου
|-
| 1975–76
| style="background:gold;"| Πρωταθλητής
| style="background:gold;"| Κυπελλούχος
| Κύπελλο Κυπελλούχων Φάση των 8
| Φαίδων Ματθαίου 
| Στιβ Γιατζόγλου, Γιώργος Καστρινάκης, Παύλος Διάκουλας, Γιώργος Μπαρλάς, Νίκος Σισμανίδης, Κίμωνας Κοκορόγιαννης, Παρασκευάς Τσάνταλης, Θανάσης Ράμμος, Γιάννης Γκαρώνης, Τόλης Σπανός, Πολ Μελίνι 
|-
| 1976–77
| style="background:silver;"| Φιναλίστ
| style="background:gold;"| Κυπελλούχος
| Κύπελλο Πρωταθλητριών Φάση των 8
| Κώστας Μουρούζης
| Στιβ Γιατζόγλου, Γιώργος Καστρινάκης, Παύλος Διάκουλας, Γιώργος Μπαρλάς, Θανάσης Ράμμος, Κίμωνας Κοκορόγιαννης, Νίκος Σισμανίδης, Τόλης Σπανός, Γιάννης Γκαρώνης, Πολ Μελίνι
|-
| 1977–78
| style="background:gold;"| Πρωταθλητής 
| style="background:gold;"| Κυπελλούχος
| Κύπελλο Κυπελλούχων Φάση των 16
| Κώστας Μουρούζης
| Στιβ Γιατζόγλου, Γιώργος Καστρινάκης, Παύλος Διάκουλας, Γιώργος Μπαρλάς, Θανάσης Ράμμος, Γιάννης Γκαρώνης, Νίκος Σισμανίδης, Κίμωνας Κοκορόγιαννης, Τόλης Σπανός, Πολ Μελίνι, Χελιώτης, Σπετσιώτης, Καρέλας
|-
| 1978–79
| style="background:silver;"| Φιναλίστ
| style="background:silver;"| Φιναλίστ
| Κύπελλο Πρωταθλητριών Ημιτελικός γύρος6η Θέση
| Κώστας Μουρούζης
| Αργύρης Καμπούρης, Στιβ Γιατζόγλου, Γιώργος Καστρινάκης, Τόλης Σπανός, Παύλος Διάκουλας, Γιώργος Μπαρλάς, Κίμωνας Κοκορόγιαννης, Νίκος Σισμανίδης, Θανάσης Ράμμος, Δημήτρης Σαμπάνης, Πολ Μελίνι, Άρης Ραφτόπουλος
|-
| 1979–80
| style="background:silver;"| Φιναλίστ
| style="background:gold;"| Κυπελλούχος
| Κύπελλο Κόρατς Φάση των 8
| Γιώργος Μπαρλάς
| Αργύρης Καμπούρης, Στιβ Γιατζόγλου, Γιώργος Καστρινάκης, Παύλος Διάκουλας, Κίμωνας Κοκορόγιαννης, Χρήστος Ιορδανίδης, Θανάσης Ράμμος, Τόλης Σπανός, Δημήτρης Σαμπάνης, Πολ Μελίνι, Άρης Ραφτόπουλος
|-
| 1980–81
| style="background:silver;"| Φιναλίστ
| Φάση των 16
| Κύπελλο Κυπελλούχων Φάση των 32
| Γιώργος Μπαρλάς
| Στιβ Γιατζόγλου, Γιώργος Καστρινάκης, Κίμωνας Κοκορόγιαννης, Γιώργος Σκροπολίθας, Παύλος Διάκουλας, Χρήστος Ιορδανίδης, Δημήτρης Σαμπάνης, Άρης Ραφτόπουλος
|-
| 1981–82
| 6η Θέση
| Φάση των 4
| Κύπελλο Κόρατς Φάση των 32
| Γιώργος Μπαρλάς
| Αργύρης Καμπούρης, Στιβ Γιατζόγλου, Παύλος Διάκουλας, Γιώργος Καστρινάκης, Κίμωνας Κοκορόγιαννης, Γιώργος Σκροπολίθας, Χρήστος Ιορδανίδης, Δημήτρης Σαμπάνης, Άρης Ραφτόπουλος
|-
| 1982–83
| 5η Θέση
| style="background:silver;"| Φιναλίστ
| Κύπελλο Κόρατς Φάση των 32
| Γιώργος Μπαρλάς
| Αργύρης Καμπούρης, Στιβ Γιατζόγλου, Γιώργος Καστρινάκης, Κίμωνας Κοκορόγιαννης, Γιώργος Σκροπολίθας, Δημήτρης Σαμπάνης, Γιάννης Παραγιός, Άρης Ραφτόπουλος, Ανδρέας Κοζάκης, Κασσίμης
|-
| 1983–84
| 7η Θέση
| Φάση των 16
| Κύπελλο Κόρατς Φάση των 16
| Θύμιος Φιλίππου
| Στιβ Γιατζόγλου, Γιώργος Καστρινάκης, Νίκος Δαρίβας, Αργύρης Καμπούρης, Τζίμης Μανιάτης, Δημήτρης Σαμπάνης, Σαράντης Παπαχριστόπουλος, Γιάννης Παραγιός, Ανδρέας Κοζάκης, Άρης Ραφτόπουλος
|-
| 1984–85
| 7η Θέση
| Φάση των 16
| Δεν αγωνίστηκε  
| Φαίδων Ματθαίου
| Νίκος Δαρίβας, Αργύρης Καμπούρης, Τζίμης Μανιάτης, Δημήτρης Σαμπάνης, Άρης Ραφτόπουλος, Γιάννης Παραγιός, Ανδρέας Κοζάκης, Γιάννης Κουκής, Σαράντης Παπαχριστόπουλος, Άγγελος Ναλμπάντης, Παπαδάκης, Κυπριώτης
|-
| 1985–86
| style="background:silver;"| Φιναλίστ
| style="background:silver;"| Φιναλίστ
| Δεν αγωνίστηκε
| Κώστας Αναστασάτος
| Αργύρης Καμπούρης, Αλέξης Χριστοδούλου, Βασίλης Ντάκουλας, Κώστας Παναγιωτόπουλος, Τζίμης Μανιάτης, Δημήτρης Σαμπάνης, Γιάννης Παραγιός, Ανδρέας Κοζάκης, Γιάννης Κουκής, Άγγελος Ναλμπάντης, Κώστας Γιαννόπουλος, Χρήστος Μαργέλης
|-
| 1986–87
| 7η Θέση
| Φάση των 4
| Κύπελλο Κόρατς Φάση των 32
| Κώστας Αναστασάτος
| Τζίμης Μανιάτης, Δημήτρης Σαμπάνης, Ηλίας Καρκαμπάσης, Αργύρης Καμπούρης, Αλέξης Χριστοδούλου, Βασίλης Ντάκουλας, Δήμος Οικονομάκος, Κώστας Παναγιωτόπουλος, Γιάννης Παραγιός, Θανάσης Κρεμπούνης, Αντρέας Καρκαβάσης, Γιάννης Κουκής, Κώστας Γιαννόπουλος 
|-
| 1987–88
| 6η Θέση
| Φάση των 16
| Δεν αγωνίστηκε
| Στιβ Γιατζόγλου
| Αργύρης Καμπούρης, Τζίμης Μανιάτης, Αλέξης Χριστοδούλου, Δημήτρης Σαμπάνης, Βασίλης Ντάκουλας, Κώστας Παναγιωτόπουλος, Ηλίας Καρκαμπάσης, Δήμος Οικονομάκος, Γιάννης Παραγιός, Πιτ Μπαλής, Θανάσης Κρεμπούνης 
|-
| 1988–89
| 8η Θέση
| Φάση των 16
| Κύπελλο Κόρατς Φάση των 8
| Στιβ Γιατζόγλου
| Κάρεϊ Σκάρι, Λάρι Μίντλετον, Αργύρης Καμπούρης, Τζορτζ Παπαδάκος, Σταύρος Ελληνιάδης, Βασίλης Ντάκουλας, Βαγγέλης Αγγέλου, Αλέξης Χριστοδούλου, Τζίμης Μανιάτης, Κώστας Παναγιωτόπουλος, Ηλίας Καρκαμπάσης
|-
| 1989–90
| 7η Θέση
| Φάση των 16
| Δεν αγωνίστηκε
| Μάκης Δενδρινός, Μιχάλης Κυρίτσης
| Τοντ Μίτσελ, Αργύρης Καμπούρης, Τζορτζ Παπαδάκος, Σταύρος Ελληνιάδης, Βαγγέλης Αγγέλου, Αλέξης Χριστοδούλου, Τζίμης Μανιάτης, Κώστας Μωραΐτης, Βασίλης Ντάκουλας, Κώστας Παναγιωτόπουλος, Ηλίας Καρκαμπάσης, Γκρεγκ Οικονόμου 
|-
| 1990–91
| 8η Θέση
| Φάση των 16
| Δεν αγωνίστηκε
| Μιχάλης Κυρίτσης
| Αργύρης Καμπούρης, Αλέξης Γιαννόπουλος, Τζορτζ Παπαδάκος, Βαγγέλης Αγγέλου, Παναγιώτης Καρατζάς, Τζίμης Μανιάτης, Αλέξης Χριστοδούλου, Γιώργος Σιγάλας,  Ηλίας Καρκαμπάσης, Σταύρος Ελληνιάδης, Κώστας Παναγιωτόπουλος, Γιώργος Μόμτσος, Γκλεν Μπλάκγουελ, Τάσος Ρόκος, Στράτος Μακρής 
|-
| 1991–92
| style="background:silver;"| Φιναλίστ
| Φάση των 8
| Δεν αγωνίστηκε
| Γιάννης Ιωαννίδης
| Ζάρκο Πάσπαλι, Γιώργος Σιγάλας, Αντώνης Σταμάτης, Αργύρης Καμπούρης, Τζορτζ Παπαδάκος, Σταύρος Ελληνιάδης, Παναγιώτης Καρατζάς, Βαγγέλης Αγγέλου, Τζίμης Μανιάτης, Κώστας Μωραΐτης, Μπάμπης Παπαδάκης, Αλέξης Γιαννόπουλος, Ηλίας Καρκαμπάσης, Γκρεγκ Μπρούκς
|-
| 1992–93
| style="background:gold;"| Πρωταθλητής
| Φάση των 4
| Ευρωπαϊκό Πρωτάθλημα Φάση των 8
| Γιάννης Ιωαννίδης
| Ζάρκο Πάσπαλι, Γουόλτερ Μπέρι, Αργύρης Καμπούρης, Τζορτζ Παπαδάκος, Σταύρος Ελληνιάδης, Γιώργος Σιγάλας, Φράνκο Νάκιτς, Μίλαν Τόμιτς, Ντράγκαν Τάρλατς, Αντώνης Σταμάτης, Μπάμπης Παπαδάκης, Γιώργος Λημνιάτης, Κώστας Μωραΐτης, Ροντ Χίγκινς
|-
| 1993–94
| style="background:gold;"| Πρωταθλητής
| style="background:gold;"| Κυπελλούχος
| style="background:silver;"| Ευρωπαϊκό Πρωτάθλημα Φιναλίστ
| Γιάννης Ιωαννίδης
| Ζάρκο Πάσπαλι, Ρόι Τάρπλεϊ, Παναγιώτης Φασούλας, Αργύρης Καμπούρης, Γιώργος Σιγάλας, Μίλαν Τόμιτς, Φράνκο Νάκιτς, Ντράγκαν Τάρλατς, Ευθύμης Μπακατσιάς, Τζορτζ Παπαδάκος, Παναγιώτης Καρατζάς, Αντώνης Σταμάτης, Γιώργος Λημνιάτης, Μπάμπης Παπαδάκης 
|-
| 1994–95
| style="background:gold;"| Πρωταθλητής
| Φάση των 26
| style="background:silver;"| Ευρωπαϊκό Πρωτάθλημα Φιναλίστ
| Γιάννης Ιωαννίδης
| Έντι Τζόνσον, Αλεξάντερ Βολκόφ, Παναγιώτης Φασούλας, Ντράγκαν Τάρλατς, Ευθύμης Μπακατσιάς, Γιώργος Σιγάλας, Αργύρης Καμπούρης, Φράνκο Νάκιτς, Μίλαν Τόμιτς, Τζορτζ Παπαδάκος, Γιώργος Λημνιάτης, Αντώνης Σταμάτης, Μπάμπης Παπαδάκης
|-
| 1995–96
| style="background:gold;"| Πρωταθλητής
| Φάση των 8
| Ευρωπαϊκό Πρωτάθλημα Φάση των 8
| Γιάννης Ιωαννίδης
| Ντέιβιντ Ρίβερς, Γουόλτερ Μπέρι, Παναγιώτης Φασούλας, Ντράγκαν Τάρλατς, Γιώργος Σιγάλας, Νάσος Γαλακτερός, Δημήτρης Παπανικολάου, Φράνκο Νάκιτς, Ευθύμης Μπακατσιάς, Μίλαν Τόμιτς, Τζορτζ Παπαδάκος, Βασίλης Σούλης, Ανατόλι Ζουρπένκο 
|-
|rowspan=2| 1996–97
|rowspan="2" style="background:gold;"| Πρωταθλητής
|rowspan="2" style="background:gold;"| Κυπελλούχος
| style="background:gold;"| Ευρωλίγκα Πρωταθλητής 
|rowspan=2| Ντούσαν Ίβκοβιτς
|rowspan=2| Ντέιβιντ Ρίβερς, Παναγιώτης Φασούλας, Γιώργος Σιγάλας, Νάσος Γαλακτερός, Ντράγκαν Τάρλατς, Γουίλι Άντερσον, Δημήτρης Παπανικολάου, Ευθύμης Μπακατσιάς, Φράνκο Νάκιτς, Μίλαν Τόμιτς, Ανατόλι Ζουρπένκο, Κρίστιαν Βέλπ, Αλεξέι Ζεβροσένκο, Έβρικ Γκρέι, Βασίλης Σούλης
|-
|-
| style="background:silver;"| ΝΒΑ-FIBA McDonald's OpenΦιναλίστ
|- 
| 1997–98
|  style="background:#cd7f32;"| 3η Θέση
|  style="background:#cd7f32;"| 3η θέση
| Ευρωλίγκα Φάση των 16 
| Ντούσαν Ίβκοβιτς
| Μάικλ Χόκινς, Αρτούρας Καρνισόβας, Τζόνι Ρότζερς, Παναγιώτης Φασούλας, Ντράγκαν Τάρλατς, Μίλαν Τόμιτς, Ντούσαν Βούκσεβιτς, Φράνκο Νάκιτς, Δημήτρης Παπανικολάου, Ευθύμης Μπακατσιάς, Αλεξέι Ζεβροσένκο, Ανατόλι Ζουρπένκο, Αλέξανδρος Ανθής, Δημήτρης Καραπλής, Νίκος Μίχαλος, Νίκος Πέττας
|-
| 1998–99
| style="background:silver;"| Φιναλίστ
| Φάση των 21
| style="background:#cd7f32;"| Ευρωλίγκα 3η Θέση
| Ντούσαν Ίβκοβιτς
| Άντονι Γκόλντγουαϊρ, Άριαν Κόμαζετς, Τζόνι Ρότζερς, Παναγιώτης Φασούλας, Φαμπρίσιο Ομπέρτο, Ντράγκαν Τάρλατς, Μίλαν Τόμιτς, Ντούσαν Βούκσεβιτς, Αλεξέι Ζεβροσένκο, Δημήτρης Παπανικολάου, Αρσέν Αντέ-Μενσά, Δημήτρης Καραπλής, Βασίλης Σούλης, Περικλής Δορκοφίκης 
|-
| 1999–00
| style="background:#cd7f32;"| 3η Θέση
| Φάση των 16
| Ευρωλίγκα Φάση των 16
| Γιάννης Ιωαννίδης
| Μπλου Έντουαρτς, Κρις Μόρις, Φαμπρίσιο Ομπέρτο, Ντράγκαν Τάρλατς, Μίλαν Τόμιτς, Ντούσαν Βούκσεβιτς, Φράνκο Νάκιτς, Δημήτρης Παπανικολάου, Αλεξέι Ζεβροσένκο, Αρσέν Αντέ-Μενσά, Ινιάκι ντε Μιγκέλ, Περικλής Δορκοφίκης, Τζος Γκράντ, Γιάννης Λάππας, Βασίλης Σούλης, Νίκος Πέττας, Μάικ Μπράουν, Τζέιμς Ρόμπινσον 
|-
| 2000–01
| style="background:silver;"| Φιναλίστ
| style="background:#cd7f32;"| 3η θέση
| Ευρωλίγκα Φάση των 8
| Ηλίας Ζούρος
| Ντίνο Ράτζα, Ντέιβιντ Ρίβερς, Νίκος Οικονόμου, Νίκος Μπουντούρης, Μίλαν Τόμιτς, Ντούσαν Βούκσεβιτς, Ινιάκι ντε Μιγκέλ, Πάτρικ Φέμερλινγκ, Δημήτρης Παπανικολάου, Στεφάν Ρισασέ, Βασίλης Σούλης, Περικλής Δορκοφίκης, Σαμ Γιάκομπσον, Γιώργος Πρίντεζης, Νίκος Πέττας, Παναγιώτης Μαντζάνας 
|-
| 2001–02
| style="background:silver;"| Φιναλίστ
| style="background:gold;"| Κυπελλούχος
| Ευρωλίγκα Φάση των 8
| Λευτέρης Σούμποτιτς
| Αλφόνσο Φορντ, Τζέιμς Φόρεστ, Νίκος Μπουντούρης, Πάτρικ Φέμερλινγκ, Ινιάκι ντε Μιγκέλ, Αλεξέι Ζεβροσένκο, Μίλαν Τόμιτς, Στεφάν Ρισασέ, Μίσαν Νικαγκμπάτσε, Θοδωρής Παπαλουκάς, Δημήτρης Παπανικολάου, Γιώργος Πρίντεζης, Περικλής Δορκοφίκης, Νιχάτ Εμρέ Εκίμ, Ντούσαν Γιέλιτς, Παναγιώτης Μαντζάνας
|-
| 2002–03
| 4η Θέση
| Φάση των 8
| Ευρωλίγκα Φάση των 8
| Λευτέρης Σούμποτιτς
| Μορίς Έβανς, ΝτεΜάρκο Τζόνσον, Κένι Μίλερ, Χουάν Αντόνιο Μοράλες, Ινιάκι ντε Μιγκέλ, Χρήστος Χαρίσης, Νίκος Μπουντούρης, Μίλαν Τόμιτς, Μίσαν Νικαγκμπάτσε, Αλεξέι Ζεβροσένκο, Μαρκ Μπράντκε, Νέναντ Μάρκοβιτς, Βέλικο Μρσιτς, Γιώργος Πρίντεζης, Παναγιώτης Μαντζάνας, Παναγιώτης Κατράνας, Γιώργος Γιαννουζάκος
|-
| 2003–04
| 8η Θέση
| style="background:silver;"| Φιναλίστ
| Ευρωλίγκα Φάση των 16
| Λευτέρης Σούμποτιτς, Ντράγκαν Σάκοτα,Μίλαν Τόμιτς
| Ρούμπεν Βολκοβίσκι, Παναγιώτης Λιαδέλης, Γιώργος Διαμαντόπουλος, Χρήστος Χαρίσης, Μπράνκο Μιλισάβλιεβιτς, Ντάλιμπορ Μπάγκαριτς, Μπόρις Γκόρενς, Κώστας Χαρίσης, Γκόραν Γιούρακ, Γιόσκο Καφετζής, Γιάννης Καλαμπόκης, Γιώργος Πρίντεζης, Βαγγέλης Σκλάβος, Μίλαν Τόμιτς, Γιώργος Γιαννουζάκος
|-
| 2004–05
| 8η Θέση
| Φάση των 16
| Ευρωλίγκα Φάση των 32
| Γιόνας Καζλάουσκας
| Μαρκί Πέρι, Ρότζερ Μέισον, Λαβόρ Ποστέλ, Μπόρις Γκόρενς, Ρόμπερτ Γκούλιας, Ιβάν Ζορόσκι, Ντούσαν Βούκσεβιτς, Άγγελος Κορωνιός, Λάζαρος Αγαδάκος, Ίβιτσα Γιούρκοβιτς, Βαγγέλης Σκλάβος, Γιάννης Καλαμπόκης, Νίκος Παπανικολόπουλος, Γιώργος Πρίντεζης, Μίλαν Τόμιτς, Έλβιρ Όβτσινα, Τζεφ Νόρντγκαρντ, Δημήτρης Μισιακός
|-
| 2005–06
| style="background:silver;"| Φιναλίστ
| Φάση των 8
| Ευρωλίγκα Φάση των 8
| Γιόνας Καζλάουσκας
| Τάιους Έντνι, Κουίνσι Λιούις, Χρήστος Χαρίσης, Νίκος Χατζής, Μανόλης Παπαμακάριος, Γιώργος Πρίντεζης, Σοφοκλής Σχορτσιανίτης, Ρενάλντας Σεϊμπούτις, Παναγιώτης Βασιλόπουλος, Άντριγια Ζίζιτς, Εουρέλιους Ζουκάουσκας, Λάζαρος Αγαδάκος, Νίκος Μπάρλος, Ματ Φρίτζι, Ιβάν Κόλιεβιτς, Δημήτρης Καλαϊτζίδης, Νίκος Αργυρόπουλος
|-
| 2006–07
| style="background:silver;"| Φιναλίστ
| Φάση των 16
| Ευρωλίγκα Φάση των 8
| Πίνι Γκέρσον
| Άλεξ Άκερ, Σκούνι Πεν, Χένρι Ντόμερκαντ, Άρβιντας Ματσιγιάουσκας, Γιάννης Μπουρούσης, Παναγιώτης Βασιλόπουλος, Μανόλης Παπαμακάριος, Άντριγια Ζίζιτς, Χρήστος Χαρίσης, Ράιαν Στακ, Σοφοκλής Σχορτσιανίτης, Νίκος Μπάρλος, Νταμίρ Μουλαομέροβιτς, Βρίμπιτσα Στεφάνοφ, Σαμ Χόσκιν, Τζέρι ΜακΝαμάρα
|-
| 2007–08
| style="background:silver;"| Φιναλίστ
| style="background:silver;"| Φιναλίστ
| Ευρωλίγκα Φάση των 8
| Πίνι Γκέρσον, Παναγιώτης Γιαννάκης
| Κίντελ Γουντς, Λιν Γκριρ, Άρβιντας Ματσιγιάουσκας, Ρόντρικ Μπλάκνει, Μαρκ Τζάκσον, Γιάννης Μπουρούσης, Παναγιώτης Βασιλόπουλος, Γιώργος Πρίντεζης, Κώστας Βασιλειάδης, Λουκάς Μαυροκεφαλίδης, Μανώλης Παπαμακάριος, Σοφοκλής Σχορτσιανίτης, Ιάκωβος Τσακαλίδης, Ρεϊνάλντας Σεϊμπούτις, Μίλος Τεόντοσιτς, Παναγιώτης Καυκής 
|-
| 2008–09
| style="background:silver;"| Φιναλίστ
| style="background:silver;"| Φιναλίστ
| Ευρωλίγκα 4η Θέση
| Παναγιώτης Γιαννάκης
| Τζος Τσίλντρες, Τζανίρο Πάργκο, Θοδωρής Παπαλουκάς, Νίκολα Βούισιτς, Γιάννης Μπουρούσης, Γιοτάμ Χαλπερίν, Λιν Γκριρ, Παναγιώτης Βασιλόπουλος, Ίαν Βουγιούκας, Σοφοκλής Σχορτσιανίτης, Γιώργος Πρίντεζης, Ζόραν Έρτσεγκ, Μίλος Τεόντοσιτς, Μιχάλης Πελεκάνος, Ιγκόρ Μιλόσεβιτς, Κώστας Σλούκας 
|-
| 2009–10
| style="background:silver;"| Φιναλίστ
| style="background:gold;"| Κυπελλούχος
| style="background:silver;"| Ευρωλίγκα Φιναλίστ
| Παναγιώτης Γιαννάκης
| Τζος Τσίλντρες, Θοδωρής Παπαλουκάς, Σκούνι Πεν, Νίκολα Βούισιτς, Γιάννης Μπουρούσης, Γιοτάμ Χαλπερίν, Παναγιώτης Βασιλόπουλος, Λίνας Κλέιζα, Σοφοκλής Σχορτσιανίτης, Μίλος Τεόντοσιτς, Κώστας Σλούκας, Κώστας Παπανικολάου, Ανδρέας Γλυνιαδάκης, Λουκάς Μαυροκεφαλίδης, Πάτρικ Μπέβερλι, Βον Ουέιφερ
|-
| 2010–11
| style="background:silver;"| Φιναλίστ
| style="background:gold;"| Κυπελλούχος
| Ευρωλίγκα Φάση των 8
| Ντούσαν Ίβκοβιτς
| Θοδωρής Παπαλουκάς, Γιάννης Μπουρούσης, Γιοτάμ Χαλπερίν, Παναγιώτης Βασιλόπουλος, Μίλος Τεόντοσιτς, Κώστας Παπανικολάου, Ανδρέας Γλυνιαδάκης, Λουκάς Μαυροκεφαλίδης, Βασίλης Σπανούλης, Ματ Νίλσεν, Ράσο Νεστέροβιτς, Μάρκο Κέσελ, Τζαμόν Γκόρντον, Δημήτρης Κατσίβελης, Γιώργος Πρίντεζης, Μιχάλης Πελεκάνος 
|-
| 2011–12
| style="background:gold;"| Πρωταθλητής
| style="background:silver;"| Φιναλίστ
| style="background:gold;"| Ευρωλίγκα Πρωταθλητής
| Ντούσαν Ίβκοβιτς
| Βαγγέλης Μάντζαρης, Έισι Λο, Δημήτρης Κατσίβελης, Βασίλης Σπανούλης, Κώστας Σλούκας, Μαρτίνας Γκετσεβίτσιους, Μιχάλης Πελεκάνος, Μάρκο Κέσελ, Κώστας Παπανικολάου, Παναγιώτης Βασιλόπουλος, Γιώργος Πρίντεζης, Πέρο Άντιτς, Τζόι Ντόρσεϊ, Κάιλ Χάινς, Λάζαρος Παπαδόπουλος, Ανδρέας Γλυνιαδάκης, Ματ Χάουαρντ, Κέιλιν Λούκας
|-
|rowspan=2| 2012–13
|rowspan="2" style="background:silver;"| Φιναλίστ
|rowspan=2 style="background:silver;"| Φιναλίστ
| style="background:gold;"| Ευρωλίγκα Πρωταθλητής
|rowspan=2| Γιώργος Μπαρτζώκας
|rowspan=2| Βαγγέλης Μάντζαρης, Έισι Λο, Δημήτρης Κατσίβελης, Βασίλης Σπανούλης, Κώστας Σλούκας, Μαρτίνας Γκετσεβίτσιους, Κώστας Παπανικολάου, Γιώργος Πρίντεζης, Πέρο Άντιτς, Τζος Πάουελ, Κάιλ Χάινς, Στράτος Περπέρογλου, Γκιόργκι Σερμαντίνι, Δημήτρης Μαυροειδής, Γιώργος Γεωργάκης, Τζόι Ντόρσεϊ, Ντορόν Πέρκινς
|-
| style="background:gold;"| Διηπειρωτικό ΚύπελλοΚυπελλούχος  
|-
| 2013–14
|  style="background:silver;"| Φιναλίστ
|  Ημιτελικά
| Ευρωλίγκα Φάση των 8
|  Γιώργος Μπαρτζώκας
| Βαγγέλης Μάντζαρης, Έισι Λο, Μάρντι Κόλινς, Δημήτρης Κατσίβελης, Ανδρέας Χριστοδούλου, Βασίλης Σπανούλης, Κώστας Σλούκας, Στράτος Περπέρογλου,  Ιωάννης Παπαπέτρου, Ματ Λοτζέσκι, Γιώργος Πρίντεζης, Δημήτρης Αγραβάνης, Μπρεντ Πέτγουεϊ, Τζαμάριο Μουν, Μπράιαντ Ντάνστον, Μίρζα Μπέγκιτς, Σέντρικ Σίμονς, Βασίλης Καββαδάς, Δημήτρης Μαυροειδής, Γκιόργκι Σερμαντίνι
|-
| 2014–15
| style="background:gold;"| Πρωταθλητής
| Προημιτελικά
| style="background:silver;"| Ευρωλίγκα Φιναλίστ
| Γιώργος Μπαρτζώκας, Γιάννης Σφαιρόπουλος
| Βαγγέλης Μάντζαρης, Δημήτρης Κατσίβελης, Ανδρέας Χριστοδούλου, Βασίλης Σπανούλης, Όλιβερ Λαφαγιέτ, Κώστας Σλούκας, Βασίλης Μουράτος, Τρεμέλ Ντάρντεν, Ιωάννης Παπαπέτρου, Ματ Λοτζέσκι, Γιώργος Πρίντεζης, Δημήτρης Αγραβάνης, Μπρεντ Πέτγουεϊ, Μπράιαντ Ντάνστον, Σέντρικ Σίμονς, Βασίλης Καββαδάς, Οθέλο Χάντερ, Μιχάλης Τσαϊρέλης
|-
| 2015–16
| style="background:gold;" | Πρωταθλητής
| Προημιτελικά
| Ευρωλίγκα  Φάση των 16
| Γιάννης Σφαιρόπουλος
| Βαγγέλης Μάντζαρης, Βασίλης Σπανούλης, Βασίλης Μουράτος, Ιωάννης Παπαπέτρου, Ματ Λοτζέσκι, Γιώργος Πρίντεζης, Δημήτρης Αγραβάνης, Οθέλο Χάντερ, Μιχάλης Τσαϊρέλης, Ντάριους Τζόνσον-Όντομ, Ντι Τζέι Στρόμπερι, Νίκολα Μιλουτίνοφ, Χακίμ Γουόρικ, Ντάνιελ Χάκετ, Κώστας Παπανικολάου, Γιάννης Αθηναίου
|-
| 2016–17
| style="background:silver;" | Φιναλίστ
| Ημιτελικά
| style="background:silver;" | Ευρωλίγκα  Φιναλίστ
| Γιάννης Σφαιρόπουλος
| Βαγγέλης Μάντζαρης, Βασίλης Σπανούλης, Ιωάννης Παπαπέτρου, Ματ Λοτζέσκι, Γιώργος Πρίντεζης, Δημήτρης Αγραβάνης, Νίκολα Μιλουτίνοφ, Ντάνιελ Χάκετ, Κώστας Παπανικολάου, Γιάννης Αθηναίου, Έρικ Γκριν, Κεμ Μπιρτς, Πάτρικ Γιανγκ, Βασίλης Τολιόπουλος, Ντόμινικ Γουότερς, Πάρης Μαραγκός
|-
| 2017–18
| style="background:silver;" | Φιναλίστ
| style="background:silver;" | Φιναλίστ
| Ευρωλίγκα  Φάση των 8
| Γιάννης Σφαιρόπουλος
| Βαγγέλης Μάντζαρης, Βασίλης Σπανούλης, Ιωάννης Παπαπέτρου, Γιώργος Πρίντεζης, Δημήτρης Αγραβάνης, Νίκολα Μιλουτίνοφ, Κώστας Παπανικολάου, Βασίλης Τολιόπουλος, Τζαμέλ ΜακΛίν, Μπόμπι Μπράουν, Γιάνις Στρέλνιεκς, Κιμ Τιλί, Νίκος Αρσενόπουλος, Μπράιαν Ρόμπερτς, Γιώργος Μπόγρης, Κάιλ Γουίλτζερ, Χόλις Τόμσον
|-
| 2018–19
| Φάση των 8
| Ημιτελικά
| Ευρωλίγκα  9η θέση
| Ντέιβιντ Μπλατ
| Βαγγέλης Μάντζαρης, Βασίλης Σπανούλης, Γιώργος Πρίντεζης, Δημήτρης Αγραβάνης, Νίκολα Μιλουτίνοφ, Κώστας Παπανικολάου, Γιάνις Στρέλνιεκς, Γιώργος Μπόγρης, Μπριάντε Γουέμπερ, Νάιτζελ Γουίλιαμς-Γκος, Αξέλ Τουπάν, Αλέξανδρος Βεζένκοφ, Αλεξέι Ποκουσέβσκι, Ζακ ΛεΝτέι
|-
| 2019–20
| Δεν αγωνίστηκε
| Δεν αγωνίστηκε
| Ευρωλίγκα  9η θέση
| Ντέιβιντ Μπλατ, Κεστούτις Κεμζούρα, Γιώργος Μπαρτζώκας
| Βασίλης Σπανούλης, Γιώργος Πρίντεζης, Νίκολα Μιλουτίνοφ, Κώστας Παπανικολάου, Αλέξανδρος Βεζένκοφ, Αλεξέι Ποκουσέβσκι, Τέιλορ Ρότσεστι, Ουέιντ Μπάλντουιν, Μπράντον Πολ, Βασίλης Χαραλαμπόπουλος, Αλέξανδρος Νικολαΐδης, Αντώνης Κόνιαρης, Ντουάιτ Μπάικς, Όγκουστιν Ρούμπιτ, Οκτάβιους Έλις, Βασίλης Χρηστίδης, Σακίλ ΜακΚίσικ
|-
| 2020–21
| Δεν αγωνίστηκε
| Δεν αγωνίστηκε
| Ευρωλίγκα  12η θέση
| Γιώργος Μπαρτζώκας
| Βασίλης Σπανούλης, Γιώργος Πρίντεζης, Κώστας Παπανικολάου, Αλέξανδρος Βεζένκοφ, Βασίλης Χαραλαμπόπουλος, Αλέξανδρος Νικολαΐδης, Οκτάβιους Έλις, Σακίλ ΜακΚίσικ, Άαρον Χάρισον, Γιαννούλης Λαρεντζάκης, Κώστας Σλούκας, Χασάν Μάρτιν, Λιβιό Ζαν-Σαρλ, Τσαρλς Τζένκινς, Κώστας Κουφός
|-
| 2021–22
| style="background:gold;" | Πρωταθλητής
| style="background:gold;"| Κυπελλούχος
| Ευρωλίγκα 4η Θέση
| Γιώργος Μπαρτζώκας
| Γιώργος Πρίντεζης, Κώστας Παπανικολάου, Αλέξανδρος Βεζένκοφ, Σακίλ ΜακΚίσικ, Γιαννούλης Λαρεντζάκης, Κώστας Σλούκας, Χασάν Μάρτιν, Λιβιό Ζαν-Σαρλ, Τόμας Γουόκαπ, Τάιλερ Ντόρσεϊ, Μιχάλης Λούντζης, Ζαΐντ Μουόσα, Κουίνσι Έισι, Σωτήρης Οικονομόπουλος, Μουσταφά Φολ
|-
|}

Statistics

Greek League records

A1 Regular seasons (Wins–Losses)

Individual awards

FIBA Hall of Fame
 Panagiotis Fasoulas
 Dušan Ivković
 Fabricio Oberto
 Sasha Volkov
FIBA Hall of Fame Candidates
 Žarko Paspalj
 Artūras Karnišovas
 Arvydas Macijauskas
 Dino Rađja
FIBA's 50 Greatest Players
 Dino Rađja
 Sasha Volkov
50 Greatest EuroLeague Contributors
 Pini Gershon
 Dušan Ivković
 Theo Papaloukas
 Dino Rađja
EuroLeague Basketball Legend Award
 Theo Papaloukas
 Dušan Ivković
 Vassilis Spanoulis
 Nikola Vujčić
EuroLeague Coach of the Year Award
 Dušan Ivković (2011–12)
 Georgios Bartzokas (2012–13, 2021–22)
All-Europe Player of the Year
 Vassilis Spanoulis (2012, 2013)
FIBA Europe Player of the Year Award
 Miloš Teodosić (2010)
Vatican's Giuseppe Sciacca World Athlete Award
 Vassilis Spanoulis (2013)
EuroLeague Best Scorer "Alphonso Ford"
 Alphonso Ford (2001–02)
 Linas Kleiza (2009–10)
EuroLeague Best Defender
 Bryant Dunston (2013–14, 2014–15)
EuroLeague Rising Star
 Kostas Papanikolaou (2012–13)

EuroLeague MVP
 Miloš Teodosić (2009–10)
 Vassilis Spanoulis (2012–13)
EuroLeague Final Four MVP
 Žarko Paspalj (1993–94)
 David Rivers (1996–97)
 Vassilis Spanoulis (2011–12, 2012–13)
All-EuroLeague First Team
 Ioannis Bourousis (2008–09)
 Linas Kleiza (2009–10)
 Miloš Teodosić (2009–10)
 Vassilis Spanoulis (2011–12, 2012–13, 2014–15)
 Georgios Printezis (2016–17)
 Sasha Vezenkov (2021–22)
All-EuroLeague Second Team
 Alphonso Ford (2001–02)
 Theo Papaloukas (2008–09)
 Josh Childress (2009–10)
 Vassilis Spanoulis (2010–11, 2013–14, 2017–18)
 Kostas Sloukas (2021–22)
EuroLeague 2001–10 All-Decade Team
 Theo Papaloukas
 Nikola Vujčić
EuroLeague 2010–20 All-Decade Team
 Vassilis Spanoulis
 Georgios Printezis
EuroLeague Finals Top Scorer
 David Rivers (1996–97)
 Kostas Papanikolaou (2011–12)
 Vassilis Spanoulis (2012–13)
 Matt Lojeski (2014–15)
EuroLeague Executive of the Year
 Panagiotis Angelopoulos (2011–12)
 Giorgos Angelopoulos (2011–12)
Greek Basket League MVP
 Panagiotis Fasoulas (1993–94, 1994–95)
 Giorgos Sigalas (1995–96)
 David Rivers (1996–97)
 Vassilis Spanoulis (2011–12, 2015–16)

Greek Basket League Finals MVP
 Giorgos Sigalas (1992–93, 1993–94, 1994–95, 1995–96, 1996–97)
 Vassilis Spanoulis (2011–12, 2014–15, 2015–16)
Greek Cup MVP
 David Rivers (1996–97)
 Alphonso Ford (2001–02)
 Miloš Teodosić (2009–10, 2010–11)
Greek League Coach of the Year
 Dušan Ivković (2011–12)
 Ioannis Sfairopoulos (2014–15)
All-Greek League Team
 Sofoklis Schortsanitis (2005–06)
 Panagiotis Vasilopoulos (2006–07)
 Ioannis Bourousis (2007–08, 2008–09, 2010–11)
 Josh Childress (2009–10)
 Vassilis Spanoulis (2010–11, 2011–12, 2012–13, 2014–15, 2015–16, 2016–17)
 Georgios Printezis (2011–12, 2013–14, 2014–15, 2015–16, 2016–17)
 Kostas Papanikolaou (2011–12, 2012–13, 2016–17)
 Kostas Sloukas (2014–15)
 Nikola Milutinov (2017–18, 2018–19)
Greek League Top Scorer
 Žarko Paspalj (1991–92)
 Josh Childress (2009–10)
Greek League Top Rebounder
 Dino Rađja (2000–01)
Greek League Assist Leader
 Theo Papaloukas (2008–09)
 Vassilis Spanoulis (2010–11, 2011–12, 2012–13, 2014–15)
Greek League Best Defender
 Joey Dorsey (2011–12)
 Bryant Dunston (2014–15)
Greek League Best Young Player
 Kostas Papanikolaou (2011–12)
 Ioannis Papapetrou (2015–16)

Notable players

 Greece:

  Vangelis Angelou
  Dimitris Agravanis
  Efthimios Bakatsias
  Giorgos Barlas
  Nikos Boudouris
  Ioannis Bourousis
  Nikos Chatzis
   Pavlos Diakoulas
  Stavros Elliniadis
  Panagiotis Fasoulas
  Nasos Galakteros
  Giannis Garonis
   Steve Giatzoglou
  Andreas Glyniadakis
  Christos Charissis
  Argiris Kambouris
  Panagiotis Karatzas
   Georgios Kastrinakis
  Makis Katsafados
  Dimitris Katsivelis
  Vassilis Kavvadas
  Kimonas Kokorogiannis
  Angelos Koronios
  Tzimis Maniatis
  Vangelis Mantzaris
  Loukas Mavrokefalidis
   Paul Melini
   George Papadakos
  Lazaros Papadopoulos
  Theo Papaloukas
  Manolis Papamakarios
  Dimitris Papanikolaou
  Kostas Papanikolaou
  Ioannis Papapetrou
  Giannis Paragios
  Michalis Pelekanos
  Stratos Perperoglou
  Georgios Printezis
  Aris Raftopoulos (†)
  Thanasis Rammos
  Sofoklis Schortsanitis
  Georgios Sigalas
  Nikos Sismanidis
  Kostas Sloukas
  Τolis Spanos (†)
  Alekos Spanoudakis (†)
  Ioannis Spanoudakis (†)
  Vassilis Spanoulis
   Jake Tsakalidis
  Theodoros Vamvakousis
  Kostas Vasileiadis
  Panagiotis Vasilopoulos
  Ian Vougioukas

 Argentina:
   Fabricio Oberto
   Rubén Wolkowyski
 Croatia:

  Arijan Komazec
   Damir Mulaomerović
   Franco Nakić
  Dino Rađja
  Nikola Vujčić
  Andrija Žižić

 France:
  Stéphane Risacher
  Axel Toupane
 FYROM:
  Pero Antić
 Georgia:
  Giorgi Shermadini
 Germany:
  Patrick Femerling
  Chris Welp (†)
 Israel:
  Yotam Halperin
 Italy:
   Daniel Hackett
 Lithuania:

  Artūras Karnišovas
  Linas Kleiza
  Martynas Gecevičius
  Renaldas Seibutis
  Arvydas Macijauskas
  Eurelijus Žukauskas

 Serbia:

  Zoran Erceg
  Nikola Milutinov
  Žarko Paspalj
   Dragan Tarlać
  Miloš Teodosić
   Milan Tomić
    Dušan Vukčević
  Marko Kešelj
   Aleksej Pokuševski

 Spain:
  Iñaki de Miguel
 Slovenia:
   Rašho Nesterović
   Mirza Begić
 Russia:
   Aleksey Savrasenko
 Ukraine:
  Sasha Volkov
 USA:

  Alex Acker
  Willie Anderson
  Walter Berry
  Patrick Beverley
  Roderick Blakney
  Josh Childress
  Tremmell Darden
   Henry Domercant
  Joey Dorsey
   Bryant Dunston
  Tyus Edney
  Blue Edwards
  Maurice Evans
  Alphonso Ford (†)
  James Forrest
  Anthony Goldwire
  Jamon Gordon
  Lynn Greer
  Michael Hawkins
  Kyle Hines
   Othello Hunter
  Shawn James
  Jerry Jenkins
  Eddie Johnson
  Darius Johnson-Odom
   Oliver Lafayette
  Acie Law
   Matt Lojeski
  Roger Mason
  Larry Middleton
  Todd Mitchell
  Jannero Pargo
  Scoonie Penn
  Marque Perry
  Brent Petway
  Josh Powell
  David Rivers
  James Robinson
   Johnny Rogers
  Carey Scurry
   D. J. Strawberry
  Roy Tarpley (†)
  Von Wafer
  Hakim Warrick
  Qyntel Woods
  Charlie Yelverton
  Patric Young

Club captains 
  Aris Raftopoulos (1984–1985)
  Tzimis Maniatis (1985–1991)
  Argiris Kambouris (1991–1995)
  Giorgos Sigalas (1995–1997)
  Milan Tomić (1997–2005)
  Nikos Chatzis (2005–2006)
  Manolis Papamakarios (2006–2008)
  Theodoros Papaloukas (2008–2011)
  Vassilis Spanoulis (2011–2021)
  Georgios Printezis (2021–present)

Head coaches

  Ioannis Spanoudakis (1948–63 & 1964–1967)
  Faidon Matthaiou (1967–76)
  Kostas Mourouzis (1976–79)
  Michalis Kyritsis (1989–91)
  Giannis Ioannidis (1991–96 & 1999–00)
   Dušan Ivković (1996–99 & 2010–12)
  Jonas Kazlauskas (2004–06)
  Pini Gershon (2006–08)
  Panagiotis Giannakis (2008–10)
  Georgios Bartzokas (2012–14, 2020–present)
  Ioannis Sfairopoulos (2014–18)
   David Blatt (2018–2019)
  Kęstutis Kemzūra (2019–2020)

Presidential history
Below is the official presidential history of Olympiacos B.C. Before 1991, Olympiacos CFP president was responsible for the management of the basketball team. In 1991, the department became professional and Sokratis Kokkalis took over as owner and president.

References

External links

  
 Olympiacos at Euroleague.net

 
Basketball
Basketball teams in Greece
EuroLeague clubs
Basketball teams established in 1931
EuroLeague-winning clubs
Sports clubs in Piraeus